

173001–173100 

|-bgcolor=#fefefe
| 173001 ||  || — || June 20, 2006 || Mount Lemmon || Mount Lemmon Survey || — || align=right | 1.7 km || 
|-id=002 bgcolor=#E9E9E9
| 173002 Dorfi || 2006 OS ||  || July 17, 2006 || Altschwendt || W. Ries || — || align=right | 2.9 km || 
|-id=003 bgcolor=#E9E9E9
| 173003 ||  || — || July 18, 2006 || Mount Lemmon || Mount Lemmon Survey || — || align=right | 2.9 km || 
|-id=004 bgcolor=#d6d6d6
| 173004 ||  || — || July 21, 2006 || Mount Lemmon || Mount Lemmon Survey || — || align=right | 3.6 km || 
|-id=005 bgcolor=#d6d6d6
| 173005 ||  || — || July 30, 2006 || Siding Spring || SSS || — || align=right | 5.2 km || 
|-id=006 bgcolor=#E9E9E9
| 173006 ||  || — || August 12, 2006 || Palomar || NEAT || — || align=right | 2.6 km || 
|-id=007 bgcolor=#d6d6d6
| 173007 ||  || — || August 12, 2006 || Palomar || NEAT || — || align=right | 2.9 km || 
|-id=008 bgcolor=#d6d6d6
| 173008 ||  || — || August 13, 2006 || Palomar || NEAT || — || align=right | 3.0 km || 
|-id=009 bgcolor=#d6d6d6
| 173009 ||  || — || August 13, 2006 || Palomar || NEAT || — || align=right | 3.5 km || 
|-id=010 bgcolor=#fefefe
| 173010 ||  || — || August 13, 2006 || Palomar || NEAT || NYS || align=right | 1.1 km || 
|-id=011 bgcolor=#fefefe
| 173011 ||  || — || August 14, 2006 || Siding Spring || SSS || — || align=right | 1.3 km || 
|-id=012 bgcolor=#d6d6d6
| 173012 ||  || — || August 15, 2006 || Palomar || NEAT || 3:2 || align=right | 7.7 km || 
|-id=013 bgcolor=#fefefe
| 173013 ||  || — || August 13, 2006 || Palomar || NEAT || — || align=right | 1.0 km || 
|-id=014 bgcolor=#E9E9E9
| 173014 ||  || — || August 15, 2006 || Palomar || NEAT || — || align=right | 1.4 km || 
|-id=015 bgcolor=#d6d6d6
| 173015 ||  || — || August 13, 2006 || Palomar || NEAT || — || align=right | 4.5 km || 
|-id=016 bgcolor=#E9E9E9
| 173016 ||  || — || August 15, 2006 || Palomar || NEAT || WIT || align=right | 1.8 km || 
|-id=017 bgcolor=#E9E9E9
| 173017 ||  || — || August 13, 2006 || Siding Spring || SSS || — || align=right | 3.0 km || 
|-id=018 bgcolor=#d6d6d6
| 173018 ||  || — || August 13, 2006 || Siding Spring || SSS || EUP || align=right | 6.8 km || 
|-id=019 bgcolor=#d6d6d6
| 173019 ||  || — || August 12, 2006 || Palomar || NEAT || AEG || align=right | 5.9 km || 
|-id=020 bgcolor=#E9E9E9
| 173020 ||  || — || August 12, 2006 || Palomar || NEAT || EUN || align=right | 2.1 km || 
|-id=021 bgcolor=#fefefe
| 173021 ||  || — || August 17, 2006 || Palomar || NEAT || NYS || align=right | 1.3 km || 
|-id=022 bgcolor=#fefefe
| 173022 ||  || — || August 17, 2006 || Palomar || NEAT || — || align=right | 1.3 km || 
|-id=023 bgcolor=#d6d6d6
| 173023 ||  || — || August 18, 2006 || Kitt Peak || Spacewatch || HYG || align=right | 5.0 km || 
|-id=024 bgcolor=#E9E9E9
| 173024 ||  || — || August 17, 2006 || Palomar || NEAT || GEF || align=right | 2.2 km || 
|-id=025 bgcolor=#E9E9E9
| 173025 ||  || — || August 17, 2006 || Palomar || NEAT || — || align=right | 2.1 km || 
|-id=026 bgcolor=#d6d6d6
| 173026 ||  || — || August 17, 2006 || Palomar || NEAT || EOS || align=right | 3.0 km || 
|-id=027 bgcolor=#E9E9E9
| 173027 ||  || — || August 17, 2006 || Palomar || NEAT || — || align=right | 1.8 km || 
|-id=028 bgcolor=#d6d6d6
| 173028 ||  || — || August 17, 2006 || Palomar || NEAT || — || align=right | 3.1 km || 
|-id=029 bgcolor=#E9E9E9
| 173029 ||  || — || August 17, 2006 || Palomar || NEAT || GEF || align=right | 2.0 km || 
|-id=030 bgcolor=#fefefe
| 173030 ||  || — || August 21, 2006 || Palomar || NEAT || FLO || align=right data-sort-value="0.91" | 910 m || 
|-id=031 bgcolor=#E9E9E9
| 173031 ||  || — || August 16, 2006 || Siding Spring || SSS || — || align=right | 3.5 km || 
|-id=032 bgcolor=#d6d6d6
| 173032 Mingus ||  ||  || August 25, 2006 || La Cañada || J. Lacruz || — || align=right | 4.2 km || 
|-id=033 bgcolor=#d6d6d6
| 173033 ||  || — || August 19, 2006 || Kitt Peak || Spacewatch || — || align=right | 4.8 km || 
|-id=034 bgcolor=#E9E9E9
| 173034 ||  || — || August 19, 2006 || Kitt Peak || Spacewatch || HEN || align=right | 1.4 km || 
|-id=035 bgcolor=#E9E9E9
| 173035 ||  || — || August 22, 2006 || Palomar || NEAT || — || align=right | 1.9 km || 
|-id=036 bgcolor=#fefefe
| 173036 ||  || — || August 23, 2006 || Palomar || NEAT || V || align=right | 1.1 km || 
|-id=037 bgcolor=#E9E9E9
| 173037 ||  || — || August 25, 2006 || RAS || A. Lowe || — || align=right | 5.0 km || 
|-id=038 bgcolor=#d6d6d6
| 173038 ||  || — || August 21, 2006 || Palomar || NEAT || KOR || align=right | 2.3 km || 
|-id=039 bgcolor=#E9E9E9
| 173039 ||  || — || August 24, 2006 || Palomar || NEAT || HEN || align=right | 1.6 km || 
|-id=040 bgcolor=#E9E9E9
| 173040 ||  || — || August 16, 2006 || Palomar || NEAT || — || align=right | 4.6 km || 
|-id=041 bgcolor=#E9E9E9
| 173041 ||  || — || August 16, 2006 || Palomar || NEAT || GEF || align=right | 1.6 km || 
|-id=042 bgcolor=#fefefe
| 173042 ||  || — || August 16, 2006 || Palomar || NEAT || — || align=right | 1.9 km || 
|-id=043 bgcolor=#d6d6d6
| 173043 ||  || — || August 28, 2006 || Anderson Mesa || LONEOS || — || align=right | 4.5 km || 
|-id=044 bgcolor=#d6d6d6
| 173044 ||  || — || August 28, 2006 || Catalina || CSS || HYG || align=right | 3.3 km || 
|-id=045 bgcolor=#d6d6d6
| 173045 ||  || — || August 27, 2006 || Anderson Mesa || LONEOS || — || align=right | 6.7 km || 
|-id=046 bgcolor=#d6d6d6
| 173046 ||  || — || August 27, 2006 || Anderson Mesa || LONEOS || — || align=right | 5.7 km || 
|-id=047 bgcolor=#E9E9E9
| 173047 ||  || — || August 29, 2006 || Catalina || CSS || NEM || align=right | 3.4 km || 
|-id=048 bgcolor=#fefefe
| 173048 ||  || — || August 17, 2006 || Palomar || NEAT || V || align=right data-sort-value="0.96" | 960 m || 
|-id=049 bgcolor=#d6d6d6
| 173049 ||  || — || August 18, 2006 || Palomar || NEAT || — || align=right | 4.3 km || 
|-id=050 bgcolor=#d6d6d6
| 173050 ||  || — || August 31, 2006 || Vicques || M. Ory || EOS || align=right | 3.9 km || 
|-id=051 bgcolor=#E9E9E9
| 173051 ||  || — || August 30, 2006 || Anderson Mesa || LONEOS || — || align=right | 2.2 km || 
|-id=052 bgcolor=#d6d6d6
| 173052 ||  || — || August 19, 2006 || Kitt Peak || Spacewatch || K-2 || align=right | 2.4 km || 
|-id=053 bgcolor=#E9E9E9
| 173053 ||  || — || September 13, 2006 || Palomar || NEAT || — || align=right | 2.2 km || 
|-id=054 bgcolor=#d6d6d6
| 173054 ||  || — || September 15, 2006 || Kitt Peak || Spacewatch || HYG || align=right | 4.1 km || 
|-id=055 bgcolor=#d6d6d6
| 173055 ||  || — || September 15, 2006 || Kitt Peak || Spacewatch || — || align=right | 3.5 km || 
|-id=056 bgcolor=#d6d6d6
| 173056 ||  || — || September 16, 2006 || Anderson Mesa || LONEOS || — || align=right | 5.6 km || 
|-id=057 bgcolor=#E9E9E9
| 173057 ||  || — || September 17, 2006 || Catalina || CSS || GEF || align=right | 2.2 km || 
|-id=058 bgcolor=#d6d6d6
| 173058 ||  || — || September 16, 2006 || Catalina || CSS || 7:4 || align=right | 7.3 km || 
|-id=059 bgcolor=#d6d6d6
| 173059 ||  || — || September 19, 2006 || Catalina || CSS || — || align=right | 4.8 km || 
|-id=060 bgcolor=#E9E9E9
| 173060 ||  || — || September 16, 2006 || Catalina || CSS || — || align=right | 3.2 km || 
|-id=061 bgcolor=#d6d6d6
| 173061 ||  || — || September 16, 2006 || Catalina || CSS || — || align=right | 5.5 km || 
|-id=062 bgcolor=#d6d6d6
| 173062 ||  || — || September 18, 2006 || Kitt Peak || Spacewatch || THM || align=right | 3.4 km || 
|-id=063 bgcolor=#E9E9E9
| 173063 ||  || — || September 18, 2006 || Kitt Peak || Spacewatch || — || align=right | 2.6 km || 
|-id=064 bgcolor=#d6d6d6
| 173064 ||  || — || September 19, 2006 || Catalina || CSS || — || align=right | 5.4 km || 
|-id=065 bgcolor=#E9E9E9
| 173065 ||  || — || September 19, 2006 || Catalina || CSS || — || align=right | 2.8 km || 
|-id=066 bgcolor=#d6d6d6
| 173066 ||  || — || September 17, 2006 || Catalina || CSS || URS || align=right | 6.4 km || 
|-id=067 bgcolor=#E9E9E9
| 173067 ||  || — || September 19, 2006 || Kitt Peak || Spacewatch || — || align=right | 2.5 km || 
|-id=068 bgcolor=#d6d6d6
| 173068 ||  || — || September 25, 2006 || Kitt Peak || Spacewatch || KAR || align=right | 2.0 km || 
|-id=069 bgcolor=#fefefe
| 173069 ||  || — || September 24, 2006 || Kitt Peak || Spacewatch || — || align=right data-sort-value="0.97" | 970 m || 
|-id=070 bgcolor=#fefefe
| 173070 ||  || — || September 26, 2006 || Kitt Peak || Spacewatch || — || align=right | 3.5 km || 
|-id=071 bgcolor=#d6d6d6
| 173071 ||  || — || September 29, 2006 || Anderson Mesa || LONEOS || 3:2 || align=right | 6.9 km || 
|-id=072 bgcolor=#d6d6d6
| 173072 ||  || — || September 30, 2006 || Apache Point || A. C. Becker || — || align=right | 3.3 km || 
|-id=073 bgcolor=#E9E9E9
| 173073 ||  || — || October 12, 2006 || Palomar || NEAT || — || align=right | 1.5 km || 
|-id=074 bgcolor=#d6d6d6
| 173074 ||  || — || October 14, 2006 || Bergisch Gladbach || W. Bickel || CHA || align=right | 2.6 km || 
|-id=075 bgcolor=#d6d6d6
| 173075 || 2006 UC || — || October 16, 2006 || Wrightwood || J. W. Young || — || align=right | 5.2 km || 
|-id=076 bgcolor=#E9E9E9
| 173076 ||  || — || October 17, 2006 || Catalina || CSS || AGN || align=right | 1.9 km || 
|-id=077 bgcolor=#d6d6d6
| 173077 ||  || — || October 19, 2006 || Kitt Peak || Spacewatch || — || align=right | 3.7 km || 
|-id=078 bgcolor=#d6d6d6
| 173078 ||  || — || October 19, 2006 || Catalina || CSS || — || align=right | 4.9 km || 
|-id=079 bgcolor=#d6d6d6
| 173079 ||  || — || October 19, 2006 || Catalina || CSS || — || align=right | 5.4 km || 
|-id=080 bgcolor=#d6d6d6
| 173080 ||  || — || October 19, 2006 || Catalina || CSS || — || align=right | 6.5 km || 
|-id=081 bgcolor=#E9E9E9
| 173081 ||  || — || October 16, 2006 || Catalina || CSS || — || align=right | 5.0 km || 
|-id=082 bgcolor=#d6d6d6
| 173082 ||  || — || October 27, 2006 || Catalina || CSS || — || align=right | 7.0 km || 
|-id=083 bgcolor=#d6d6d6
| 173083 ||  || — || November 18, 2006 || Kitt Peak || Spacewatch || SHU3:2 || align=right | 7.8 km || 
|-id=084 bgcolor=#C2FFFF
| 173084 ||  || — || August 5, 2007 || Črni Vrh || Črni Vrh || L4 || align=right | 14 km || 
|-id=085 bgcolor=#d6d6d6
| 173085 ||  || — || August 8, 2007 || Socorro || LINEAR || KAR || align=right | 1.8 km || 
|-id=086 bgcolor=#C2FFFF
| 173086 Nireus ||  ||  || September 8, 2007 || Vicques || M. Ory || L4 || align=right | 16 km || 
|-id=087 bgcolor=#d6d6d6
| 173087 ||  || — || September 2, 2007 || Catalina || CSS || — || align=right | 5.8 km || 
|-id=088 bgcolor=#fefefe
| 173088 ||  || — || September 8, 2007 || Anderson Mesa || LONEOS || MAS || align=right | 1.0 km || 
|-id=089 bgcolor=#fefefe
| 173089 ||  || — || September 8, 2007 || Anderson Mesa || LONEOS || — || align=right data-sort-value="0.93" | 930 m || 
|-id=090 bgcolor=#fefefe
| 173090 ||  || — || September 10, 2007 || Kitt Peak || Spacewatch || V || align=right data-sort-value="0.95" | 950 m || 
|-id=091 bgcolor=#d6d6d6
| 173091 ||  || — || September 13, 2007 || Kitt Peak || Spacewatch || KOR || align=right | 1.8 km || 
|-id=092 bgcolor=#fefefe
| 173092 ||  || — || September 14, 2007 || Mount Lemmon || Mount Lemmon Survey || — || align=right | 1.0 km || 
|-id=093 bgcolor=#E9E9E9
| 173093 ||  || — || October 7, 2007 || Mount Lemmon || Mount Lemmon Survey || ADE || align=right | 3.3 km || 
|-id=094 bgcolor=#d6d6d6
| 173094 Wielicki ||  ||  || October 14, 2007 || Suno || V. S. Casulli || KOR || align=right | 1.8 km || 
|-id=095 bgcolor=#fefefe
| 173095 ||  || — || October 13, 2007 || RAS || A. Lowe || FLO || align=right | 1.1 km || 
|-id=096 bgcolor=#d6d6d6
| 173096 ||  || — || October 5, 2007 || Kitt Peak || Spacewatch || — || align=right | 3.9 km || 
|-id=097 bgcolor=#d6d6d6
| 173097 ||  || — || October 8, 2007 || Anderson Mesa || LONEOS || — || align=right | 5.2 km || 
|-id=098 bgcolor=#d6d6d6
| 173098 ||  || — || October 6, 2007 || Kitt Peak || Spacewatch || CHA || align=right | 3.0 km || 
|-id=099 bgcolor=#E9E9E9
| 173099 ||  || — || October 8, 2007 || Socorro || LINEAR || — || align=right | 2.9 km || 
|-id=100 bgcolor=#fefefe
| 173100 ||  || — || October 10, 2007 || Kitt Peak || Spacewatch || — || align=right | 1.2 km || 
|}

173101–173200 

|-bgcolor=#d6d6d6
| 173101 ||  || — || October 13, 2007 || Catalina || CSS || CHA || align=right | 3.1 km || 
|-id=102 bgcolor=#d6d6d6
| 173102 ||  || — || October 13, 2007 || Catalina || CSS || — || align=right | 2.9 km || 
|-id=103 bgcolor=#E9E9E9
| 173103 ||  || — || October 19, 2007 || Kitt Peak || Spacewatch || — || align=right | 2.5 km || 
|-id=104 bgcolor=#fefefe
| 173104 ||  || — || October 31, 2007 || Kitt Peak || Spacewatch || — || align=right | 1.2 km || 
|-id=105 bgcolor=#fefefe
| 173105 ||  || — || November 4, 2007 || 7300 Observatory || W. K. Y. Yeung || NYS || align=right data-sort-value="0.91" | 910 m || 
|-id=106 bgcolor=#fefefe
| 173106 ||  || — || November 3, 2007 || Kitt Peak || Spacewatch || NYS || align=right data-sort-value="0.92" | 920 m || 
|-id=107 bgcolor=#d6d6d6
| 173107 ||  || — || November 3, 2007 || Kitt Peak || Spacewatch || KOR || align=right | 2.0 km || 
|-id=108 bgcolor=#d6d6d6
| 173108 Ingola || 6240 P-L ||  || September 24, 1960 || Palomar || PLS || Tj (2.96) || align=right | 4.7 km || 
|-id=109 bgcolor=#fefefe
| 173109 || 7635 P-L || — || October 17, 1960 || Palomar || PLS || — || align=right | 1.2 km || 
|-id=110 bgcolor=#E9E9E9
| 173110 || 2323 T-1 || — || March 25, 1971 || Palomar || PLS || — || align=right | 3.7 km || 
|-id=111 bgcolor=#E9E9E9
| 173111 || 2059 T-2 || — || September 29, 1973 || Palomar || PLS || — || align=right | 1.5 km || 
|-id=112 bgcolor=#E9E9E9
| 173112 || 4327 T-2 || — || September 29, 1973 || Palomar || PLS || — || align=right | 3.3 km || 
|-id=113 bgcolor=#fefefe
| 173113 || 5038 T-2 || — || September 25, 1973 || Palomar || PLS || V || align=right | 1.3 km || 
|-id=114 bgcolor=#E9E9E9
| 173114 || 1195 T-3 || — || October 17, 1977 || Palomar || PLS || — || align=right | 2.9 km || 
|-id=115 bgcolor=#d6d6d6
| 173115 || 3145 T-3 || — || October 16, 1977 || Palomar || PLS || — || align=right | 5.1 km || 
|-id=116 bgcolor=#E9E9E9
| 173116 || 4162 T-3 || — || October 16, 1977 || Palomar || PLS || — || align=right | 1.8 km || 
|-id=117 bgcolor=#C2FFFF
| 173117 Promachus ||  ||  || September 24, 1973 || Palomar || PLS || L4 || align=right | 13 km || 
|-id=118 bgcolor=#d6d6d6
| 173118 ||  || — || March 2, 1981 || Siding Spring || S. J. Bus || — || align=right | 4.7 km || 
|-id=119 bgcolor=#d6d6d6
| 173119 ||  || — || March 2, 1981 || Siding Spring || S. J. Bus || — || align=right | 3.9 km || 
|-id=120 bgcolor=#E9E9E9
| 173120 ||  || — || October 10, 1990 || Tautenburg Observatory || F. Börngen, L. D. Schmadel || — || align=right | 1.7 km || 
|-id=121 bgcolor=#d6d6d6
| 173121 ||  || — || November 5, 1991 || Kitt Peak || Spacewatch || — || align=right | 2.9 km || 
|-id=122 bgcolor=#d6d6d6
| 173122 ||  || — || January 30, 1992 || Kitt Peak || Spacewatch || — || align=right | 3.4 km || 
|-id=123 bgcolor=#d6d6d6
| 173123 ||  || — || March 19, 1993 || La Silla || UESAC || — || align=right | 2.8 km || 
|-id=124 bgcolor=#fefefe
| 173124 ||  || — || March 19, 1993 || La Silla || UESAC || — || align=right | 1.9 km || 
|-id=125 bgcolor=#fefefe
| 173125 ||  || — || August 15, 1993 || Kitt Peak || Spacewatch || — || align=right | 1.2 km || 
|-id=126 bgcolor=#E9E9E9
| 173126 ||  || — || January 8, 1994 || Kitt Peak || Spacewatch || — || align=right | 3.0 km || 
|-id=127 bgcolor=#E9E9E9
| 173127 ||  || — || February 7, 1994 || La Silla || E. W. Elst || — || align=right | 3.2 km || 
|-id=128 bgcolor=#fefefe
| 173128 ||  || — || April 19, 1994 || Kitt Peak || Spacewatch || — || align=right data-sort-value="0.97" | 970 m || 
|-id=129 bgcolor=#fefefe
| 173129 ||  || — || May 1, 1994 || Kitt Peak || Spacewatch || SVE || align=right | 4.9 km || 
|-id=130 bgcolor=#fefefe
| 173130 ||  || — || May 4, 1994 || Kitt Peak || Spacewatch || ERI || align=right | 1.7 km || 
|-id=131 bgcolor=#d6d6d6
| 173131 ||  || — || August 10, 1994 || La Silla || E. W. Elst || HYG || align=right | 4.1 km || 
|-id=132 bgcolor=#d6d6d6
| 173132 ||  || — || September 2, 1994 || Kitt Peak || Spacewatch || — || align=right | 5.1 km || 
|-id=133 bgcolor=#E9E9E9
| 173133 ||  || — || October 4, 1994 || Kitt Peak || Spacewatch || — || align=right | 1.3 km || 
|-id=134 bgcolor=#fefefe
| 173134 ||  || — || December 27, 1994 || Caussols || C. Pollas || H || align=right | 1.2 km || 
|-id=135 bgcolor=#E9E9E9
| 173135 ||  || — || March 25, 1995 || Kitt Peak || Spacewatch || NEM || align=right | 3.3 km || 
|-id=136 bgcolor=#d6d6d6
| 173136 ||  || — || April 24, 1995 || Kitt Peak || Spacewatch || — || align=right | 3.8 km || 
|-id=137 bgcolor=#d6d6d6
| 173137 ||  || — || April 26, 1995 || Kitt Peak || Spacewatch || — || align=right | 3.7 km || 
|-id=138 bgcolor=#fefefe
| 173138 ||  || — || August 22, 1995 || Kitt Peak || Spacewatch || — || align=right | 1.2 km || 
|-id=139 bgcolor=#fefefe
| 173139 ||  || — || September 18, 1995 || Kitt Peak || Spacewatch || MAS || align=right | 1.1 km || 
|-id=140 bgcolor=#d6d6d6
| 173140 ||  || — || September 18, 1995 || Kitt Peak || Spacewatch || THM || align=right | 3.2 km || 
|-id=141 bgcolor=#fefefe
| 173141 ||  || — || September 25, 1995 || Kitt Peak || Spacewatch || MAS || align=right | 1.4 km || 
|-id=142 bgcolor=#fefefe
| 173142 ||  || — || September 21, 1995 || Kitt Peak || Spacewatch || NYS || align=right data-sort-value="0.82" | 820 m || 
|-id=143 bgcolor=#d6d6d6
| 173143 ||  || — || September 17, 1995 || Kitt Peak || Spacewatch || THM || align=right | 2.3 km || 
|-id=144 bgcolor=#E9E9E9
| 173144 ||  || — || October 15, 1995 || Kitt Peak || Spacewatch || — || align=right | 1.4 km || 
|-id=145 bgcolor=#d6d6d6
| 173145 ||  || — || October 15, 1995 || Kitt Peak || Spacewatch || HYG || align=right | 3.0 km || 
|-id=146 bgcolor=#fefefe
| 173146 || 1995 UM || — || October 17, 1995 || Sormano || P. Sicoli, P. Ghezzi || V || align=right | 1.3 km || 
|-id=147 bgcolor=#fefefe
| 173147 ||  || — || October 22, 1995 || Kitt Peak || Spacewatch || NYS || align=right | 1.1 km || 
|-id=148 bgcolor=#d6d6d6
| 173148 ||  || — || November 14, 1995 || Kitt Peak || Spacewatch || — || align=right | 5.4 km || 
|-id=149 bgcolor=#fefefe
| 173149 ||  || — || November 15, 1995 || Kitt Peak || Spacewatch || NYS || align=right data-sort-value="0.92" | 920 m || 
|-id=150 bgcolor=#d6d6d6
| 173150 ||  || — || November 16, 1995 || Kitt Peak || Spacewatch || — || align=right | 3.4 km || 
|-id=151 bgcolor=#fefefe
| 173151 ||  || — || November 18, 1995 || Kitt Peak || Spacewatch || V || align=right data-sort-value="0.99" | 990 m || 
|-id=152 bgcolor=#d6d6d6
| 173152 ||  || — || December 14, 1995 || Kitt Peak || Spacewatch || — || align=right | 5.3 km || 
|-id=153 bgcolor=#E9E9E9
| 173153 ||  || — || March 13, 1996 || Kitt Peak || Spacewatch || JUN || align=right | 1.6 km || 
|-id=154 bgcolor=#FA8072
| 173154 || 1996 ME || — || June 16, 1996 || Kitt Peak || Spacewatch || — || align=right | 1.3 km || 
|-id=155 bgcolor=#E9E9E9
| 173155 || 1996 RP || — || September 8, 1996 || Prescott || P. G. Comba || — || align=right | 4.0 km || 
|-id=156 bgcolor=#fefefe
| 173156 ||  || — || September 7, 1996 || Kitt Peak || Spacewatch || FLO || align=right data-sort-value="0.96" | 960 m || 
|-id=157 bgcolor=#fefefe
| 173157 ||  || — || September 8, 1996 || Kitt Peak || Spacewatch || — || align=right | 1.1 km || 
|-id=158 bgcolor=#d6d6d6
| 173158 ||  || — || October 6, 1996 || Prescott || P. G. Comba || — || align=right | 2.6 km || 
|-id=159 bgcolor=#fefefe
| 173159 ||  || — || October 8, 1996 || La Silla || E. W. Elst || — || align=right | 1.1 km || 
|-id=160 bgcolor=#fefefe
| 173160 ||  || — || October 17, 1996 || Kitt Peak || Spacewatch || — || align=right | 1.1 km || 
|-id=161 bgcolor=#fefefe
| 173161 ||  || — || November 9, 1996 || Kitt Peak || Spacewatch || — || align=right | 1.6 km || 
|-id=162 bgcolor=#fefefe
| 173162 ||  || — || December 1, 1996 || Kitt Peak || Spacewatch || — || align=right data-sort-value="0.87" | 870 m || 
|-id=163 bgcolor=#fefefe
| 173163 ||  || — || December 6, 1996 || Kitt Peak || Spacewatch || — || align=right | 1.2 km || 
|-id=164 bgcolor=#fefefe
| 173164 ||  || — || December 7, 1996 || Oizumi || T. Kobayashi || NYS || align=right | 1.2 km || 
|-id=165 bgcolor=#d6d6d6
| 173165 ||  || — || January 15, 1997 || Kleť || Kleť Obs. || — || align=right | 5.4 km || 
|-id=166 bgcolor=#d6d6d6
| 173166 ||  || — || January 30, 1997 || Oizumi || T. Kobayashi || EUP || align=right | 7.7 km || 
|-id=167 bgcolor=#fefefe
| 173167 ||  || — || February 3, 1997 || Kitt Peak || Spacewatch || — || align=right | 1.5 km || 
|-id=168 bgcolor=#fefefe
| 173168 ||  || — || March 4, 1997 || Kitt Peak || Spacewatch || — || align=right | 1.1 km || 
|-id=169 bgcolor=#d6d6d6
| 173169 ||  || — || March 5, 1997 || Kitt Peak || Spacewatch || — || align=right | 7.6 km || 
|-id=170 bgcolor=#fefefe
| 173170 ||  || — || March 10, 1997 || Kitt Peak || Spacewatch || — || align=right data-sort-value="0.79" | 790 m || 
|-id=171 bgcolor=#d6d6d6
| 173171 ||  || — || March 11, 1997 || Socorro || LINEAR || — || align=right | 4.5 km || 
|-id=172 bgcolor=#fefefe
| 173172 ||  || — || March 10, 1997 || La Silla || E. W. Elst || NYS || align=right | 1.00 km || 
|-id=173 bgcolor=#E9E9E9
| 173173 ||  || — || April 7, 1997 || Kitt Peak || Spacewatch || — || align=right | 2.3 km || 
|-id=174 bgcolor=#fefefe
| 173174 ||  || — || April 3, 1997 || Socorro || LINEAR || MAS || align=right | 1.3 km || 
|-id=175 bgcolor=#fefefe
| 173175 ||  || — || April 29, 1997 || Kitt Peak || Spacewatch || NYS || align=right | 1.0 km || 
|-id=176 bgcolor=#fefefe
| 173176 || 1997 KO || — || May 29, 1997 || Mount Hopkins || C. W. Hergenrother || — || align=right | 1.3 km || 
|-id=177 bgcolor=#fefefe
| 173177 ||  || — || September 23, 1997 || Modra || A. Galád, P. Kolény || — || align=right | 1.1 km || 
|-id=178 bgcolor=#E9E9E9
| 173178 ||  || — || October 3, 1997 || Kitt Peak || Spacewatch || — || align=right | 2.1 km || 
|-id=179 bgcolor=#fefefe
| 173179 ||  || — || October 6, 1997 || Xinglong || SCAP || — || align=right | 1.1 km || 
|-id=180 bgcolor=#E9E9E9
| 173180 ||  || — || October 25, 1997 || Kitt Peak || Spacewatch || — || align=right | 3.2 km || 
|-id=181 bgcolor=#d6d6d6
| 173181 || 1998 FM || — || March 18, 1998 || Kitt Peak || Spacewatch || — || align=right | 3.8 km || 
|-id=182 bgcolor=#fefefe
| 173182 || 1998 FY || — || March 18, 1998 || Kitt Peak || Spacewatch || — || align=right | 1.1 km || 
|-id=183 bgcolor=#fefefe
| 173183 ||  || — || March 20, 1998 || Socorro || LINEAR || — || align=right | 1.3 km || 
|-id=184 bgcolor=#fefefe
| 173184 ||  || — || March 20, 1998 || Socorro || LINEAR || — || align=right | 1.3 km || 
|-id=185 bgcolor=#fefefe
| 173185 ||  || — || March 20, 1998 || Socorro || LINEAR || NYS || align=right data-sort-value="0.98" | 980 m || 
|-id=186 bgcolor=#fefefe
| 173186 ||  || — || March 24, 1998 || Socorro || LINEAR || FLO || align=right | 1.0 km || 
|-id=187 bgcolor=#d6d6d6
| 173187 ||  || — || April 21, 1998 || Socorro || LINEAR || — || align=right | 3.4 km || 
|-id=188 bgcolor=#fefefe
| 173188 ||  || — || April 21, 1998 || Socorro || LINEAR || ERI || align=right | 2.5 km || 
|-id=189 bgcolor=#d6d6d6
| 173189 ||  || — || April 23, 1998 || Socorro || LINEAR || — || align=right | 4.8 km || 
|-id=190 bgcolor=#fefefe
| 173190 ||  || — || May 22, 1998 || Socorro || LINEAR || — || align=right | 1.3 km || 
|-id=191 bgcolor=#fefefe
| 173191 ||  || — || May 23, 1998 || Socorro || LINEAR || ERI || align=right | 2.4 km || 
|-id=192 bgcolor=#fefefe
| 173192 ||  || — || July 15, 1998 || Kitt Peak || Spacewatch || — || align=right | 1.4 km || 
|-id=193 bgcolor=#E9E9E9
| 173193 ||  || — || August 17, 1998 || Socorro || LINEAR || — || align=right | 2.5 km || 
|-id=194 bgcolor=#E9E9E9
| 173194 ||  || — || August 17, 1998 || Socorro || LINEAR || — || align=right | 4.0 km || 
|-id=195 bgcolor=#E9E9E9
| 173195 ||  || — || August 17, 1998 || Socorro || LINEAR || — || align=right | 1.2 km || 
|-id=196 bgcolor=#E9E9E9
| 173196 ||  || — || August 17, 1998 || Socorro || LINEAR || — || align=right | 1.5 km || 
|-id=197 bgcolor=#E9E9E9
| 173197 ||  || — || August 17, 1998 || Socorro || LINEAR || — || align=right | 4.0 km || 
|-id=198 bgcolor=#E9E9E9
| 173198 ||  || — || August 17, 1998 || Socorro || LINEAR || — || align=right | 1.9 km || 
|-id=199 bgcolor=#E9E9E9
| 173199 ||  || — || August 24, 1998 || Socorro || LINEAR || — || align=right | 2.1 km || 
|-id=200 bgcolor=#E9E9E9
| 173200 ||  || — || August 28, 1998 || Socorro || LINEAR || — || align=right | 2.8 km || 
|}

173201–173300 

|-bgcolor=#E9E9E9
| 173201 ||  || — || September 15, 1998 || Anderson Mesa || LONEOS || — || align=right | 2.0 km || 
|-id=202 bgcolor=#E9E9E9
| 173202 ||  || — || September 14, 1998 || Socorro || LINEAR || — || align=right | 2.5 km || 
|-id=203 bgcolor=#E9E9E9
| 173203 ||  || — || September 14, 1998 || Socorro || LINEAR || — || align=right | 1.5 km || 
|-id=204 bgcolor=#E9E9E9
| 173204 ||  || — || September 14, 1998 || Socorro || LINEAR || EUN || align=right | 2.4 km || 
|-id=205 bgcolor=#E9E9E9
| 173205 ||  || — || September 14, 1998 || Socorro || LINEAR || — || align=right | 4.4 km || 
|-id=206 bgcolor=#E9E9E9
| 173206 ||  || — || September 17, 1998 || Anderson Mesa || LONEOS || — || align=right | 3.5 km || 
|-id=207 bgcolor=#E9E9E9
| 173207 ||  || — || September 21, 1998 || Kitt Peak || Spacewatch || — || align=right | 1.4 km || 
|-id=208 bgcolor=#E9E9E9
| 173208 ||  || — || September 24, 1998 || Kleť || Kleť Obs. || MAR || align=right | 1.4 km || 
|-id=209 bgcolor=#E9E9E9
| 173209 ||  || — || September 18, 1998 || Kitt Peak || Spacewatch || — || align=right | 1.4 km || 
|-id=210 bgcolor=#fefefe
| 173210 ||  || — || September 28, 1998 || Kitt Peak || Spacewatch || — || align=right | 1.6 km || 
|-id=211 bgcolor=#E9E9E9
| 173211 ||  || — || September 26, 1998 || Socorro || LINEAR || — || align=right | 1.3 km || 
|-id=212 bgcolor=#E9E9E9
| 173212 ||  || — || September 26, 1998 || Socorro || LINEAR || — || align=right | 1.5 km || 
|-id=213 bgcolor=#E9E9E9
| 173213 ||  || — || September 26, 1998 || Socorro || LINEAR || — || align=right | 1.3 km || 
|-id=214 bgcolor=#E9E9E9
| 173214 ||  || — || September 26, 1998 || Socorro || LINEAR || — || align=right | 1.8 km || 
|-id=215 bgcolor=#E9E9E9
| 173215 ||  || — || September 25, 1998 || Anderson Mesa || LONEOS || — || align=right | 1.2 km || 
|-id=216 bgcolor=#E9E9E9
| 173216 ||  || — || October 15, 1998 || Višnjan Observatory || K. Korlević || — || align=right | 2.1 km || 
|-id=217 bgcolor=#E9E9E9
| 173217 ||  || — || October 12, 1998 || Kitt Peak || Spacewatch || — || align=right | 1.5 km || 
|-id=218 bgcolor=#E9E9E9
| 173218 ||  || — || October 15, 1998 || Caussols || ODAS || EUN || align=right | 2.2 km || 
|-id=219 bgcolor=#E9E9E9
| 173219 ||  || — || October 14, 1998 || Kitt Peak || Spacewatch || — || align=right | 1.3 km || 
|-id=220 bgcolor=#E9E9E9
| 173220 ||  || — || October 14, 1998 || Kitt Peak || Spacewatch || — || align=right | 2.0 km || 
|-id=221 bgcolor=#E9E9E9
| 173221 ||  || — || October 11, 1998 || Anderson Mesa || LONEOS || — || align=right | 2.1 km || 
|-id=222 bgcolor=#E9E9E9
| 173222 ||  || — || October 17, 1998 || Xinglong || SCAP || — || align=right | 2.0 km || 
|-id=223 bgcolor=#E9E9E9
| 173223 ||  || — || October 23, 1998 || Kitt Peak || Spacewatch || — || align=right | 2.5 km || 
|-id=224 bgcolor=#E9E9E9
| 173224 ||  || — || October 17, 1998 || Xinglong || SCAP || — || align=right | 2.2 km || 
|-id=225 bgcolor=#E9E9E9
| 173225 ||  || — || November 10, 1998 || Socorro || LINEAR || — || align=right | 3.4 km || 
|-id=226 bgcolor=#E9E9E9
| 173226 ||  || — || November 10, 1998 || Socorro || LINEAR || CLO || align=right | 3.2 km || 
|-id=227 bgcolor=#E9E9E9
| 173227 ||  || — || November 10, 1998 || Socorro || LINEAR || — || align=right | 2.6 km || 
|-id=228 bgcolor=#E9E9E9
| 173228 ||  || — || November 15, 1998 || Kitt Peak || Spacewatch || — || align=right | 1.1 km || 
|-id=229 bgcolor=#E9E9E9
| 173229 ||  || — || November 21, 1998 || Socorro || LINEAR || EUN || align=right | 1.9 km || 
|-id=230 bgcolor=#E9E9E9
| 173230 || 1998 XM || — || December 6, 1998 || San Marcello || A. Boattini, L. Tesi || — || align=right | 2.1 km || 
|-id=231 bgcolor=#E9E9E9
| 173231 || 1998 XX || — || December 7, 1998 || Caussols || ODAS || EUN || align=right | 1.8 km || 
|-id=232 bgcolor=#FFC2E0
| 173232 ||  || — || December 12, 1998 || Socorro || LINEAR || AMO +1km || align=right data-sort-value="0.83" | 830 m || 
|-id=233 bgcolor=#E9E9E9
| 173233 ||  || — || December 22, 1998 || Kitt Peak || Spacewatch || — || align=right | 3.9 km || 
|-id=234 bgcolor=#E9E9E9
| 173234 ||  || — || January 7, 1999 || Kitt Peak || Spacewatch || WIT || align=right | 1.5 km || 
|-id=235 bgcolor=#E9E9E9
| 173235 ||  || — || January 24, 1999 || Višnjan Observatory || K. Korlević || — || align=right | 4.4 km || 
|-id=236 bgcolor=#E9E9E9
| 173236 ||  || — || January 16, 1999 || Kitt Peak || Spacewatch || — || align=right | 2.3 km || 
|-id=237 bgcolor=#E9E9E9
| 173237 ||  || — || January 19, 1999 || Kitt Peak || Spacewatch || — || align=right | 3.0 km || 
|-id=238 bgcolor=#fefefe
| 173238 ||  || — || February 21, 1999 || Kitt Peak || Spacewatch || — || align=right data-sort-value="0.81" | 810 m || 
|-id=239 bgcolor=#E9E9E9
| 173239 ||  || — || March 22, 1999 || Anderson Mesa || LONEOS || DOR || align=right | 4.0 km || 
|-id=240 bgcolor=#fefefe
| 173240 ||  || — || April 11, 1999 || Kitt Peak || Spacewatch || — || align=right data-sort-value="0.82" | 820 m || 
|-id=241 bgcolor=#E9E9E9
| 173241 ||  || — || April 18, 1999 || Catalina || CSS || — || align=right | 2.7 km || 
|-id=242 bgcolor=#fefefe
| 173242 ||  || — || May 8, 1999 || Catalina || CSS || — || align=right | 1.4 km || 
|-id=243 bgcolor=#fefefe
| 173243 ||  || — || May 12, 1999 || Socorro || LINEAR || FLO || align=right | 1.0 km || 
|-id=244 bgcolor=#fefefe
| 173244 || 1999 KD || — || May 16, 1999 || Kitt Peak || Spacewatch || — || align=right | 1.8 km || 
|-id=245 bgcolor=#FA8072
| 173245 ||  || — || June 8, 1999 || Socorro || LINEAR || — || align=right | 1.3 km || 
|-id=246 bgcolor=#fefefe
| 173246 || 1999 MP || — || June 20, 1999 || Reedy Creek || J. Broughton || — || align=right | 4.0 km || 
|-id=247 bgcolor=#fefefe
| 173247 ||  || — || September 7, 1999 || Socorro || LINEAR || — || align=right | 1.9 km || 
|-id=248 bgcolor=#fefefe
| 173248 ||  || — || September 7, 1999 || Socorro || LINEAR || ERI || align=right | 2.9 km || 
|-id=249 bgcolor=#fefefe
| 173249 ||  || — || September 7, 1999 || Socorro || LINEAR || NYS || align=right data-sort-value="0.95" | 950 m || 
|-id=250 bgcolor=#fefefe
| 173250 ||  || — || September 7, 1999 || Socorro || LINEAR || — || align=right | 3.4 km || 
|-id=251 bgcolor=#fefefe
| 173251 ||  || — || September 7, 1999 || Socorro || LINEAR || NYS || align=right data-sort-value="0.96" | 960 m || 
|-id=252 bgcolor=#fefefe
| 173252 ||  || — || September 7, 1999 || Socorro || LINEAR || MAS || align=right data-sort-value="0.96" | 960 m || 
|-id=253 bgcolor=#fefefe
| 173253 ||  || — || September 7, 1999 || Socorro || LINEAR || NYS || align=right | 1.2 km || 
|-id=254 bgcolor=#fefefe
| 173254 ||  || — || September 7, 1999 || Socorro || LINEAR || NYS || align=right | 1.0 km || 
|-id=255 bgcolor=#fefefe
| 173255 ||  || — || September 8, 1999 || Socorro || LINEAR || V || align=right | 1.1 km || 
|-id=256 bgcolor=#fefefe
| 173256 ||  || — || September 9, 1999 || Socorro || LINEAR || — || align=right | 1.4 km || 
|-id=257 bgcolor=#fefefe
| 173257 ||  || — || September 9, 1999 || Socorro || LINEAR || NYS || align=right | 1.2 km || 
|-id=258 bgcolor=#fefefe
| 173258 ||  || — || September 9, 1999 || Socorro || LINEAR || — || align=right | 1.2 km || 
|-id=259 bgcolor=#fefefe
| 173259 ||  || — || September 9, 1999 || Socorro || LINEAR || NYS || align=right data-sort-value="0.96" | 960 m || 
|-id=260 bgcolor=#fefefe
| 173260 ||  || — || September 9, 1999 || Socorro || LINEAR || — || align=right | 1.6 km || 
|-id=261 bgcolor=#fefefe
| 173261 ||  || — || September 9, 1999 || Socorro || LINEAR || ERI || align=right | 2.8 km || 
|-id=262 bgcolor=#fefefe
| 173262 ||  || — || September 15, 1999 || Monte Agliale || M. M. M. Santangelo || — || align=right | 1.1 km || 
|-id=263 bgcolor=#fefefe
| 173263 ||  || — || September 9, 1999 || Socorro || LINEAR || NYS || align=right | 1.3 km || 
|-id=264 bgcolor=#fefefe
| 173264 ||  || — || September 9, 1999 || Socorro || LINEAR || NYS || align=right | 1.3 km || 
|-id=265 bgcolor=#fefefe
| 173265 ||  || — || September 9, 1999 || Socorro || LINEAR || — || align=right | 1.6 km || 
|-id=266 bgcolor=#fefefe
| 173266 ||  || — || September 9, 1999 || Socorro || LINEAR || NYS || align=right data-sort-value="0.81" | 810 m || 
|-id=267 bgcolor=#d6d6d6
| 173267 ||  || — || September 10, 1999 || Socorro || LINEAR || — || align=right | 5.1 km || 
|-id=268 bgcolor=#fefefe
| 173268 ||  || — || September 10, 1999 || Socorro || LINEAR || — || align=right | 1.4 km || 
|-id=269 bgcolor=#fefefe
| 173269 ||  || — || September 4, 1999 || Catalina || CSS || NYS || align=right | 1.1 km || 
|-id=270 bgcolor=#E9E9E9
| 173270 ||  || — || September 7, 1999 || Catalina || CSS || MAR || align=right | 1.6 km || 
|-id=271 bgcolor=#fefefe
| 173271 ||  || — || September 7, 1999 || Socorro || LINEAR || — || align=right | 1.3 km || 
|-id=272 bgcolor=#fefefe
| 173272 ||  || — || September 3, 1999 || Kitt Peak || Spacewatch || — || align=right | 1.1 km || 
|-id=273 bgcolor=#fefefe
| 173273 ||  || — || September 29, 1999 || Socorro || LINEAR || CHL || align=right | 3.5 km || 
|-id=274 bgcolor=#FA8072
| 173274 ||  || — || September 29, 1999 || Socorro || LINEAR || — || align=right | 1.8 km || 
|-id=275 bgcolor=#E9E9E9
| 173275 ||  || — || October 14, 1999 || Ondřejov || L. Kotková || MAR || align=right | 1.9 km || 
|-id=276 bgcolor=#fefefe
| 173276 ||  || — || October 5, 1999 || Catalina || CSS || NYS || align=right | 1.0 km || 
|-id=277 bgcolor=#fefefe
| 173277 ||  || — || October 4, 1999 || Kitt Peak || Spacewatch || — || align=right | 1.0 km || 
|-id=278 bgcolor=#fefefe
| 173278 ||  || — || October 6, 1999 || Kitt Peak || Spacewatch || — || align=right | 1.0 km || 
|-id=279 bgcolor=#fefefe
| 173279 ||  || — || October 8, 1999 || Kitt Peak || Spacewatch || — || align=right | 1.1 km || 
|-id=280 bgcolor=#fefefe
| 173280 ||  || — || October 9, 1999 || Kitt Peak || Spacewatch || NYS || align=right | 1.4 km || 
|-id=281 bgcolor=#d6d6d6
| 173281 ||  || — || October 15, 1999 || Kitt Peak || Spacewatch || — || align=right | 3.3 km || 
|-id=282 bgcolor=#fefefe
| 173282 ||  || — || October 4, 1999 || Socorro || LINEAR || — || align=right | 3.3 km || 
|-id=283 bgcolor=#fefefe
| 173283 ||  || — || October 4, 1999 || Socorro || LINEAR || FLO || align=right | 1.3 km || 
|-id=284 bgcolor=#E9E9E9
| 173284 ||  || — || October 4, 1999 || Socorro || LINEAR || — || align=right | 1.4 km || 
|-id=285 bgcolor=#fefefe
| 173285 ||  || — || October 4, 1999 || Socorro || LINEAR || — || align=right | 1.2 km || 
|-id=286 bgcolor=#fefefe
| 173286 ||  || — || October 4, 1999 || Socorro || LINEAR || ERI || align=right | 2.7 km || 
|-id=287 bgcolor=#E9E9E9
| 173287 ||  || — || October 7, 1999 || Socorro || LINEAR || — || align=right | 1.2 km || 
|-id=288 bgcolor=#fefefe
| 173288 ||  || — || October 7, 1999 || Socorro || LINEAR || NYS || align=right | 1.6 km || 
|-id=289 bgcolor=#E9E9E9
| 173289 ||  || — || October 9, 1999 || Socorro || LINEAR || — || align=right | 1.6 km || 
|-id=290 bgcolor=#E9E9E9
| 173290 ||  || — || October 10, 1999 || Socorro || LINEAR || — || align=right | 1.5 km || 
|-id=291 bgcolor=#fefefe
| 173291 ||  || — || October 12, 1999 || Socorro || LINEAR || — || align=right | 1.6 km || 
|-id=292 bgcolor=#d6d6d6
| 173292 ||  || — || October 13, 1999 || Socorro || LINEAR || — || align=right | 3.9 km || 
|-id=293 bgcolor=#fefefe
| 173293 ||  || — || October 2, 1999 || Anderson Mesa || LONEOS || — || align=right | 1.5 km || 
|-id=294 bgcolor=#fefefe
| 173294 ||  || — || October 3, 1999 || Catalina || CSS || V || align=right | 1.1 km || 
|-id=295 bgcolor=#fefefe
| 173295 ||  || — || October 5, 1999 || Catalina || CSS || MAS || align=right | 1.4 km || 
|-id=296 bgcolor=#fefefe
| 173296 ||  || — || October 15, 1999 || Anderson Mesa || LONEOS || — || align=right | 1.3 km || 
|-id=297 bgcolor=#fefefe
| 173297 ||  || — || October 6, 1999 || Socorro || LINEAR || V || align=right | 1.0 km || 
|-id=298 bgcolor=#fefefe
| 173298 ||  || — || October 10, 1999 || Socorro || LINEAR || MAS || align=right | 1.0 km || 
|-id=299 bgcolor=#fefefe
| 173299 ||  || — || October 3, 1999 || Anderson Mesa || LONEOS || — || align=right | 1.3 km || 
|-id=300 bgcolor=#fefefe
| 173300 ||  || — || October 4, 1999 || Kitt Peak || Spacewatch || NYS || align=right data-sort-value="0.94" | 940 m || 
|}

173301–173400 

|-bgcolor=#fefefe
| 173301 ||  || — || October 12, 1999 || Kitt Peak || Spacewatch || NYS || align=right data-sort-value="0.94" | 940 m || 
|-id=302 bgcolor=#fefefe
| 173302 ||  || — || October 31, 1999 || Socorro || LINEAR || H || align=right data-sort-value="0.88" | 880 m || 
|-id=303 bgcolor=#E9E9E9
| 173303 ||  || — || October 29, 1999 || Catalina || CSS || — || align=right | 1.5 km || 
|-id=304 bgcolor=#E9E9E9
| 173304 ||  || — || October 31, 1999 || Kitt Peak || Spacewatch || — || align=right | 1.1 km || 
|-id=305 bgcolor=#fefefe
| 173305 ||  || — || October 31, 1999 || Kitt Peak || Spacewatch || NYS || align=right data-sort-value="0.96" | 960 m || 
|-id=306 bgcolor=#fefefe
| 173306 ||  || — || October 29, 1999 || Catalina || CSS || — || align=right | 1.3 km || 
|-id=307 bgcolor=#fefefe
| 173307 ||  || — || October 31, 1999 || Catalina || CSS || — || align=right | 1.9 km || 
|-id=308 bgcolor=#E9E9E9
| 173308 ||  || — || November 6, 1999 || Fountain Hills || C. W. Juels || — || align=right | 2.7 km || 
|-id=309 bgcolor=#FA8072
| 173309 ||  || — || November 13, 1999 || Fountain Hills || C. W. Juels || — || align=right | 2.6 km || 
|-id=310 bgcolor=#fefefe
| 173310 ||  || — || November 3, 1999 || Socorro || LINEAR || — || align=right | 1.3 km || 
|-id=311 bgcolor=#fefefe
| 173311 ||  || — || November 10, 1999 || Socorro || LINEAR || — || align=right | 2.7 km || 
|-id=312 bgcolor=#fefefe
| 173312 ||  || — || November 10, 1999 || Socorro || LINEAR || MAS || align=right | 1.3 km || 
|-id=313 bgcolor=#fefefe
| 173313 ||  || — || November 11, 1999 || Kitt Peak || Spacewatch || NYS || align=right | 2.4 km || 
|-id=314 bgcolor=#fefefe
| 173314 ||  || — || November 4, 1999 || Catalina || CSS || — || align=right | 1.5 km || 
|-id=315 bgcolor=#fefefe
| 173315 ||  || — || November 3, 1999 || Socorro || LINEAR || V || align=right | 1.1 km || 
|-id=316 bgcolor=#fefefe
| 173316 ||  || — || November 3, 1999 || Socorro || LINEAR || V || align=right | 1.1 km || 
|-id=317 bgcolor=#fefefe
| 173317 ||  || — || November 4, 1999 || Socorro || LINEAR || NYS || align=right | 1.4 km || 
|-id=318 bgcolor=#E9E9E9
| 173318 ||  || — || November 4, 1999 || Socorro || LINEAR || — || align=right | 1.8 km || 
|-id=319 bgcolor=#fefefe
| 173319 ||  || — || November 4, 1999 || Socorro || LINEAR || NYS || align=right | 1.1 km || 
|-id=320 bgcolor=#fefefe
| 173320 ||  || — || November 9, 1999 || Socorro || LINEAR || — || align=right | 1.4 km || 
|-id=321 bgcolor=#fefefe
| 173321 ||  || — || November 9, 1999 || Socorro || LINEAR || MAS || align=right | 3.1 km || 
|-id=322 bgcolor=#fefefe
| 173322 ||  || — || November 9, 1999 || Kitt Peak || Spacewatch || — || align=right | 1.4 km || 
|-id=323 bgcolor=#fefefe
| 173323 ||  || — || November 10, 1999 || Kitt Peak || Spacewatch || V || align=right | 1.1 km || 
|-id=324 bgcolor=#fefefe
| 173324 ||  || — || November 10, 1999 || Kitt Peak || Spacewatch || NYS || align=right | 1.1 km || 
|-id=325 bgcolor=#fefefe
| 173325 ||  || — || November 10, 1999 || Kitt Peak || Spacewatch || NYS || align=right | 1.1 km || 
|-id=326 bgcolor=#fefefe
| 173326 ||  || — || November 12, 1999 || Socorro || LINEAR || — || align=right | 1.5 km || 
|-id=327 bgcolor=#fefefe
| 173327 ||  || — || November 14, 1999 || Socorro || LINEAR || NYS || align=right | 1.0 km || 
|-id=328 bgcolor=#fefefe
| 173328 ||  || — || November 14, 1999 || Socorro || LINEAR || MAS || align=right | 1.4 km || 
|-id=329 bgcolor=#fefefe
| 173329 ||  || — || November 15, 1999 || Socorro || LINEAR || NYS || align=right | 1.3 km || 
|-id=330 bgcolor=#E9E9E9
| 173330 ||  || — || November 15, 1999 || Socorro || LINEAR || ADE || align=right | 2.5 km || 
|-id=331 bgcolor=#fefefe
| 173331 ||  || — || November 15, 1999 || Socorro || LINEAR || — || align=right | 1.8 km || 
|-id=332 bgcolor=#fefefe
| 173332 ||  || — || November 11, 1999 || Catalina || CSS || — || align=right | 1.6 km || 
|-id=333 bgcolor=#fefefe
| 173333 ||  || — || November 5, 1999 || Kitt Peak || Spacewatch || — || align=right data-sort-value="0.98" | 980 m || 
|-id=334 bgcolor=#fefefe
| 173334 ||  || — || November 28, 1999 || Kitt Peak || Spacewatch || — || align=right | 1.3 km || 
|-id=335 bgcolor=#fefefe
| 173335 ||  || — || November 28, 1999 || Kitt Peak || Spacewatch || MAS || align=right | 1.2 km || 
|-id=336 bgcolor=#fefefe
| 173336 ||  || — || November 28, 1999 || Kitt Peak || Spacewatch || — || align=right | 1.1 km || 
|-id=337 bgcolor=#fefefe
| 173337 ||  || — || December 6, 1999 || Catalina || CSS || V || align=right | 1.4 km || 
|-id=338 bgcolor=#E9E9E9
| 173338 ||  || — || December 5, 1999 || Socorro || LINEAR || RAF || align=right | 1.8 km || 
|-id=339 bgcolor=#fefefe
| 173339 ||  || — || December 7, 1999 || Socorro || LINEAR || CHL || align=right | 4.5 km || 
|-id=340 bgcolor=#E9E9E9
| 173340 ||  || — || December 6, 1999 || Socorro || LINEAR || — || align=right | 2.7 km || 
|-id=341 bgcolor=#fefefe
| 173341 ||  || — || December 7, 1999 || Socorro || LINEAR || MAS || align=right | 1.5 km || 
|-id=342 bgcolor=#fefefe
| 173342 ||  || — || December 7, 1999 || Socorro || LINEAR || — || align=right | 1.5 km || 
|-id=343 bgcolor=#fefefe
| 173343 ||  || — || December 7, 1999 || Socorro || LINEAR || NYS || align=right | 1.3 km || 
|-id=344 bgcolor=#fefefe
| 173344 ||  || — || December 7, 1999 || Socorro || LINEAR || NYS || align=right | 1.2 km || 
|-id=345 bgcolor=#E9E9E9
| 173345 ||  || — || December 7, 1999 || Socorro || LINEAR || — || align=right | 2.9 km || 
|-id=346 bgcolor=#fefefe
| 173346 ||  || — || December 7, 1999 || Socorro || LINEAR || NYS || align=right | 1.1 km || 
|-id=347 bgcolor=#E9E9E9
| 173347 ||  || — || December 7, 1999 || Socorro || LINEAR || BRU || align=right | 5.7 km || 
|-id=348 bgcolor=#fefefe
| 173348 ||  || — || December 3, 1999 || Socorro || LINEAR || — || align=right | 2.9 km || 
|-id=349 bgcolor=#fefefe
| 173349 ||  || — || December 3, 1999 || Kitt Peak || Spacewatch || — || align=right | 1.6 km || 
|-id=350 bgcolor=#fefefe
| 173350 ||  || — || December 8, 1999 || Socorro || LINEAR || NYS || align=right | 1.5 km || 
|-id=351 bgcolor=#d6d6d6
| 173351 ||  || — || December 8, 1999 || Socorro || LINEAR || HIL3:2 || align=right | 11 km || 
|-id=352 bgcolor=#E9E9E9
| 173352 ||  || — || December 12, 1999 || Socorro || LINEAR || RAF || align=right | 1.6 km || 
|-id=353 bgcolor=#fefefe
| 173353 ||  || — || December 9, 1999 || Kitt Peak || Spacewatch || — || align=right | 1.2 km || 
|-id=354 bgcolor=#fefefe
| 173354 ||  || — || December 17, 1999 || Socorro || LINEAR || H || align=right | 1.7 km || 
|-id=355 bgcolor=#E9E9E9
| 173355 ||  || — || December 16, 1999 || Kitt Peak || Spacewatch || — || align=right | 1.8 km || 
|-id=356 bgcolor=#E9E9E9
| 173356 ||  || — || December 17, 1999 || Socorro || LINEAR || — || align=right | 3.1 km || 
|-id=357 bgcolor=#fefefe
| 173357 ||  || — || December 27, 1999 || Kitt Peak || Spacewatch || — || align=right | 1.4 km || 
|-id=358 bgcolor=#E9E9E9
| 173358 ||  || — || December 27, 1999 || Kitt Peak || Spacewatch || BRU || align=right | 5.8 km || 
|-id=359 bgcolor=#E9E9E9
| 173359 || 2000 AQ || — || January 2, 2000 || Kitt Peak || Spacewatch || — || align=right | 2.3 km || 
|-id=360 bgcolor=#FA8072
| 173360 ||  || — || January 2, 2000 || Socorro || LINEAR || H || align=right | 1.1 km || 
|-id=361 bgcolor=#fefefe
| 173361 ||  || — || January 4, 2000 || Socorro || LINEAR || H || align=right | 1.0 km || 
|-id=362 bgcolor=#fefefe
| 173362 ||  || — || January 4, 2000 || Socorro || LINEAR || H || align=right data-sort-value="0.92" | 920 m || 
|-id=363 bgcolor=#fefefe
| 173363 ||  || — || January 5, 2000 || Socorro || LINEAR || H || align=right | 1.3 km || 
|-id=364 bgcolor=#fefefe
| 173364 ||  || — || January 5, 2000 || Socorro || LINEAR || H || align=right | 1.0 km || 
|-id=365 bgcolor=#fefefe
| 173365 ||  || — || January 4, 2000 || Socorro || LINEAR || — || align=right | 1.3 km || 
|-id=366 bgcolor=#E9E9E9
| 173366 ||  || — || January 5, 2000 || Socorro || LINEAR || KON || align=right | 5.0 km || 
|-id=367 bgcolor=#fefefe
| 173367 ||  || — || January 5, 2000 || Socorro || LINEAR || — || align=right | 1.1 km || 
|-id=368 bgcolor=#fefefe
| 173368 ||  || — || January 4, 2000 || Socorro || LINEAR || H || align=right | 1.3 km || 
|-id=369 bgcolor=#E9E9E9
| 173369 ||  || — || January 5, 2000 || Socorro || LINEAR || — || align=right | 1.9 km || 
|-id=370 bgcolor=#fefefe
| 173370 ||  || — || January 8, 2000 || Socorro || LINEAR || H || align=right | 1.0 km || 
|-id=371 bgcolor=#fefefe
| 173371 ||  || — || January 8, 2000 || Socorro || LINEAR || — || align=right | 1.9 km || 
|-id=372 bgcolor=#E9E9E9
| 173372 ||  || — || January 15, 2000 || Prescott || P. G. Comba || — || align=right | 1.7 km || 
|-id=373 bgcolor=#fefefe
| 173373 ||  || — || January 7, 2000 || Kitt Peak || Spacewatch || H || align=right | 1.1 km || 
|-id=374 bgcolor=#fefefe
| 173374 ||  || — || January 10, 2000 || Kitt Peak || Spacewatch || H || align=right | 1.3 km || 
|-id=375 bgcolor=#E9E9E9
| 173375 ||  || — || January 3, 2000 || Kitt Peak || Spacewatch || — || align=right | 1.4 km || 
|-id=376 bgcolor=#E9E9E9
| 173376 ||  || — || January 5, 2000 || Socorro || LINEAR || — || align=right | 1.7 km || 
|-id=377 bgcolor=#fefefe
| 173377 || 2000 BZ || — || January 28, 2000 || Socorro || LINEAR || H || align=right | 1.00 km || 
|-id=378 bgcolor=#fefefe
| 173378 ||  || — || January 26, 2000 || Socorro || LINEAR || H || align=right data-sort-value="0.84" | 840 m || 
|-id=379 bgcolor=#E9E9E9
| 173379 ||  || — || January 26, 2000 || Kitt Peak || Spacewatch || — || align=right | 2.1 km || 
|-id=380 bgcolor=#E9E9E9
| 173380 ||  || — || January 26, 2000 || Kitt Peak || Spacewatch || — || align=right | 1.3 km || 
|-id=381 bgcolor=#E9E9E9
| 173381 ||  || — || January 28, 2000 || Kitt Peak || Spacewatch || RAF || align=right | 1.3 km || 
|-id=382 bgcolor=#fefefe
| 173382 ||  || — || January 30, 2000 || Kitt Peak || Spacewatch || V || align=right | 1.2 km || 
|-id=383 bgcolor=#E9E9E9
| 173383 ||  || — || February 2, 2000 || Socorro || LINEAR || — || align=right | 1.9 km || 
|-id=384 bgcolor=#E9E9E9
| 173384 ||  || — || February 2, 2000 || Socorro || LINEAR || — || align=right | 4.1 km || 
|-id=385 bgcolor=#E9E9E9
| 173385 ||  || — || February 2, 2000 || Socorro || LINEAR || — || align=right | 3.0 km || 
|-id=386 bgcolor=#E9E9E9
| 173386 ||  || — || February 2, 2000 || Socorro || LINEAR || — || align=right | 4.0 km || 
|-id=387 bgcolor=#E9E9E9
| 173387 ||  || — || February 2, 2000 || Socorro || LINEAR || EUN || align=right | 2.5 km || 
|-id=388 bgcolor=#fefefe
| 173388 ||  || — || February 2, 2000 || Socorro || LINEAR || H || align=right data-sort-value="0.90" | 900 m || 
|-id=389 bgcolor=#fefefe
| 173389 ||  || — || February 6, 2000 || Socorro || LINEAR || H || align=right data-sort-value="0.85" | 850 m || 
|-id=390 bgcolor=#fefefe
| 173390 ||  || — || February 6, 2000 || Socorro || LINEAR || H || align=right data-sort-value="0.79" | 790 m || 
|-id=391 bgcolor=#E9E9E9
| 173391 ||  || — || February 6, 2000 || Socorro || LINEAR || — || align=right | 3.0 km || 
|-id=392 bgcolor=#E9E9E9
| 173392 ||  || — || February 1, 2000 || Kitt Peak || Spacewatch || — || align=right | 1.8 km || 
|-id=393 bgcolor=#E9E9E9
| 173393 ||  || — || February 4, 2000 || Socorro || LINEAR || — || align=right | 1.7 km || 
|-id=394 bgcolor=#E9E9E9
| 173394 ||  || — || February 4, 2000 || Kitt Peak || Spacewatch || — || align=right | 1.4 km || 
|-id=395 bgcolor=#E9E9E9
| 173395 Dweinberg ||  ||  || February 12, 2000 || Apache Point || SDSS || WIT || align=right | 1.5 km || 
|-id=396 bgcolor=#E9E9E9
| 173396 ||  || — || February 26, 2000 || Kitt Peak || Spacewatch || — || align=right | 1.3 km || 
|-id=397 bgcolor=#E9E9E9
| 173397 ||  || — || February 28, 2000 || Socorro || LINEAR || — || align=right | 1.6 km || 
|-id=398 bgcolor=#E9E9E9
| 173398 ||  || — || February 29, 2000 || Socorro || LINEAR || — || align=right | 1.5 km || 
|-id=399 bgcolor=#E9E9E9
| 173399 ||  || — || February 29, 2000 || Socorro || LINEAR || — || align=right | 1.7 km || 
|-id=400 bgcolor=#E9E9E9
| 173400 ||  || — || February 29, 2000 || Socorro || LINEAR || — || align=right | 2.7 km || 
|}

173401–173500 

|-bgcolor=#E9E9E9
| 173401 ||  || — || February 29, 2000 || Socorro || LINEAR || — || align=right | 1.2 km || 
|-id=402 bgcolor=#E9E9E9
| 173402 ||  || — || February 27, 2000 || Kitt Peak || Spacewatch || — || align=right | 1.9 km || 
|-id=403 bgcolor=#E9E9E9
| 173403 ||  || — || February 29, 2000 || Socorro || LINEAR || — || align=right | 1.7 km || 
|-id=404 bgcolor=#E9E9E9
| 173404 ||  || — || February 29, 2000 || Socorro || LINEAR || — || align=right | 3.6 km || 
|-id=405 bgcolor=#E9E9E9
| 173405 ||  || — || March 4, 2000 || Socorro || LINEAR || EUN || align=right | 1.9 km || 
|-id=406 bgcolor=#E9E9E9
| 173406 ||  || — || March 4, 2000 || Kitt Peak || Spacewatch || — || align=right | 3.5 km || 
|-id=407 bgcolor=#E9E9E9
| 173407 ||  || — || March 3, 2000 || Socorro || LINEAR || — || align=right | 1.5 km || 
|-id=408 bgcolor=#E9E9E9
| 173408 ||  || — || March 5, 2000 || Socorro || LINEAR || — || align=right | 1.5 km || 
|-id=409 bgcolor=#fefefe
| 173409 ||  || — || March 5, 2000 || Socorro || LINEAR || H || align=right | 1.1 km || 
|-id=410 bgcolor=#E9E9E9
| 173410 ||  || — || March 5, 2000 || Socorro || LINEAR || — || align=right | 1.6 km || 
|-id=411 bgcolor=#E9E9E9
| 173411 ||  || — || March 10, 2000 || Socorro || LINEAR || — || align=right | 3.1 km || 
|-id=412 bgcolor=#E9E9E9
| 173412 ||  || — || March 10, 2000 || Socorro || LINEAR || — || align=right | 2.1 km || 
|-id=413 bgcolor=#E9E9E9
| 173413 ||  || — || March 9, 2000 || Kitt Peak || Spacewatch || — || align=right | 1.5 km || 
|-id=414 bgcolor=#E9E9E9
| 173414 ||  || — || March 12, 2000 || Kitt Peak || Spacewatch || EUN || align=right | 1.8 km || 
|-id=415 bgcolor=#E9E9E9
| 173415 ||  || — || March 11, 2000 || Anderson Mesa || LONEOS || — || align=right | 4.4 km || 
|-id=416 bgcolor=#E9E9E9
| 173416 ||  || — || March 11, 2000 || Socorro || LINEAR || — || align=right | 1.2 km || 
|-id=417 bgcolor=#E9E9E9
| 173417 ||  || — || March 11, 2000 || Catalina || CSS || — || align=right | 2.1 km || 
|-id=418 bgcolor=#fefefe
| 173418 ||  || — || March 1, 2000 || Catalina || CSS || H || align=right | 1.3 km || 
|-id=419 bgcolor=#E9E9E9
| 173419 ||  || — || March 25, 2000 || Kitt Peak || Spacewatch || — || align=right | 1.5 km || 
|-id=420 bgcolor=#E9E9E9
| 173420 ||  || — || March 26, 2000 || Anderson Mesa || LONEOS || — || align=right | 2.3 km || 
|-id=421 bgcolor=#E9E9E9
| 173421 ||  || — || March 29, 2000 || Socorro || LINEAR || — || align=right | 4.3 km || 
|-id=422 bgcolor=#E9E9E9
| 173422 ||  || — || March 27, 2000 || Anderson Mesa || LONEOS || — || align=right | 1.8 km || 
|-id=423 bgcolor=#E9E9E9
| 173423 ||  || — || March 26, 2000 || Anderson Mesa || LONEOS || — || align=right | 1.8 km || 
|-id=424 bgcolor=#E9E9E9
| 173424 ||  || — || April 5, 2000 || Socorro || LINEAR || ADE || align=right | 3.2 km || 
|-id=425 bgcolor=#E9E9E9
| 173425 ||  || — || April 5, 2000 || Socorro || LINEAR || — || align=right | 2.5 km || 
|-id=426 bgcolor=#E9E9E9
| 173426 ||  || — || April 7, 2000 || Kitt Peak || Spacewatch || PAD || align=right | 4.0 km || 
|-id=427 bgcolor=#fefefe
| 173427 ||  || — || April 6, 2000 || Anderson Mesa || LONEOS || H || align=right data-sort-value="0.89" | 890 m || 
|-id=428 bgcolor=#E9E9E9
| 173428 ||  || — || April 5, 2000 || Socorro || LINEAR || — || align=right | 2.3 km || 
|-id=429 bgcolor=#E9E9E9
| 173429 ||  || — || April 6, 2000 || Anderson Mesa || LONEOS || — || align=right | 2.8 km || 
|-id=430 bgcolor=#E9E9E9
| 173430 ||  || — || April 6, 2000 || Anderson Mesa || LONEOS || — || align=right | 1.9 km || 
|-id=431 bgcolor=#E9E9E9
| 173431 ||  || — || April 9, 2000 || Anderson Mesa || LONEOS || EUN || align=right | 2.2 km || 
|-id=432 bgcolor=#E9E9E9
| 173432 ||  || — || April 2, 2000 || Anderson Mesa || LONEOS || — || align=right | 1.4 km || 
|-id=433 bgcolor=#E9E9E9
| 173433 ||  || — || April 25, 2000 || Kitt Peak || Spacewatch || HEN || align=right | 1.3 km || 
|-id=434 bgcolor=#E9E9E9
| 173434 ||  || — || April 29, 2000 || Socorro || LINEAR || MRX || align=right | 1.8 km || 
|-id=435 bgcolor=#E9E9E9
| 173435 ||  || — || April 29, 2000 || Kitt Peak || Spacewatch || HEN || align=right | 1.7 km || 
|-id=436 bgcolor=#E9E9E9
| 173436 ||  || — || April 26, 2000 || Anderson Mesa || LONEOS || — || align=right | 2.8 km || 
|-id=437 bgcolor=#E9E9E9
| 173437 ||  || — || May 7, 2000 || Socorro || LINEAR || MAR || align=right | 1.8 km || 
|-id=438 bgcolor=#E9E9E9
| 173438 ||  || — || May 7, 2000 || Kitt Peak || Spacewatch || HEN || align=right | 1.5 km || 
|-id=439 bgcolor=#fefefe
| 173439 ||  || — || May 27, 2000 || Socorro || LINEAR || — || align=right | 1.1 km || 
|-id=440 bgcolor=#E9E9E9
| 173440 ||  || — || May 24, 2000 || Kitt Peak || Spacewatch || PAD || align=right | 3.9 km || 
|-id=441 bgcolor=#E9E9E9
| 173441 ||  || — || May 30, 2000 || Kitt Peak || Spacewatch || — || align=right | 2.3 km || 
|-id=442 bgcolor=#E9E9E9
| 173442 ||  || — || May 27, 2000 || Anderson Mesa || LONEOS || — || align=right | 2.7 km || 
|-id=443 bgcolor=#fefefe
| 173443 ||  || — || May 26, 2000 || Socorro || LINEAR || H || align=right | 1.2 km || 
|-id=444 bgcolor=#FA8072
| 173444 ||  || — || June 5, 2000 || Eskridge || G. Hug || — || align=right | 2.4 km || 
|-id=445 bgcolor=#d6d6d6
| 173445 ||  || — || July 5, 2000 || Anderson Mesa || LONEOS || — || align=right | 5.5 km || 
|-id=446 bgcolor=#d6d6d6
| 173446 ||  || — || July 30, 2000 || Prescott || P. G. Comba || — || align=right | 7.8 km || 
|-id=447 bgcolor=#fefefe
| 173447 ||  || — || August 2, 2000 || Socorro || LINEAR || FLO || align=right data-sort-value="0.99" | 990 m || 
|-id=448 bgcolor=#d6d6d6
| 173448 ||  || — || August 2, 2000 || Socorro || LINEAR || — || align=right | 5.7 km || 
|-id=449 bgcolor=#d6d6d6
| 173449 ||  || — || August 25, 2000 || Emerald Lane || L. Ball || EOS || align=right | 2.9 km || 
|-id=450 bgcolor=#E9E9E9
| 173450 ||  || — || August 25, 2000 || Socorro || LINEAR || — || align=right | 5.2 km || 
|-id=451 bgcolor=#d6d6d6
| 173451 ||  || — || August 25, 2000 || Višnjan Observatory || K. Korlević, M. Jurić || — || align=right | 5.4 km || 
|-id=452 bgcolor=#fefefe
| 173452 ||  || — || August 24, 2000 || Socorro || LINEAR || — || align=right data-sort-value="0.96" | 960 m || 
|-id=453 bgcolor=#d6d6d6
| 173453 ||  || — || August 24, 2000 || Socorro || LINEAR || — || align=right | 5.1 km || 
|-id=454 bgcolor=#fefefe
| 173454 ||  || — || August 24, 2000 || Socorro || LINEAR || — || align=right | 1.3 km || 
|-id=455 bgcolor=#E9E9E9
| 173455 ||  || — || August 24, 2000 || Socorro || LINEAR || — || align=right | 4.7 km || 
|-id=456 bgcolor=#d6d6d6
| 173456 ||  || — || August 24, 2000 || Socorro || LINEAR || — || align=right | 4.0 km || 
|-id=457 bgcolor=#FA8072
| 173457 ||  || — || August 24, 2000 || Socorro || LINEAR || — || align=right | 1.0 km || 
|-id=458 bgcolor=#FA8072
| 173458 ||  || — || August 24, 2000 || Socorro || LINEAR || — || align=right | 1.4 km || 
|-id=459 bgcolor=#fefefe
| 173459 ||  || — || August 25, 2000 || Socorro || LINEAR || — || align=right | 1.2 km || 
|-id=460 bgcolor=#fefefe
| 173460 ||  || — || August 25, 2000 || Socorro || LINEAR || — || align=right | 1.1 km || 
|-id=461 bgcolor=#fefefe
| 173461 ||  || — || August 28, 2000 || Socorro || LINEAR || — || align=right | 1.3 km || 
|-id=462 bgcolor=#d6d6d6
| 173462 ||  || — || August 29, 2000 || Socorro || LINEAR || THM || align=right | 6.7 km || 
|-id=463 bgcolor=#d6d6d6
| 173463 ||  || — || August 24, 2000 || Socorro || LINEAR || — || align=right | 5.1 km || 
|-id=464 bgcolor=#d6d6d6
| 173464 ||  || — || August 31, 2000 || Socorro || LINEAR || EUP || align=right | 7.5 km || 
|-id=465 bgcolor=#d6d6d6
| 173465 ||  || — || August 31, 2000 || Socorro || LINEAR || — || align=right | 5.1 km || 
|-id=466 bgcolor=#fefefe
| 173466 ||  || — || August 31, 2000 || Socorro || LINEAR || — || align=right | 1.2 km || 
|-id=467 bgcolor=#d6d6d6
| 173467 ||  || — || August 31, 2000 || Socorro || LINEAR || — || align=right | 5.7 km || 
|-id=468 bgcolor=#d6d6d6
| 173468 ||  || — || August 31, 2000 || Socorro || LINEAR || HYG || align=right | 4.4 km || 
|-id=469 bgcolor=#fefefe
| 173469 ||  || — || September 1, 2000 || Socorro || LINEAR || FLO || align=right data-sort-value="0.82" | 820 m || 
|-id=470 bgcolor=#fefefe
| 173470 ||  || — || September 3, 2000 || Socorro || LINEAR || — || align=right | 1.3 km || 
|-id=471 bgcolor=#fefefe
| 173471 ||  || — || September 7, 2000 || Kitt Peak || Spacewatch || — || align=right | 2.8 km || 
|-id=472 bgcolor=#E9E9E9
| 173472 ||  || — || September 2, 2000 || Anderson Mesa || LONEOS || — || align=right | 5.8 km || 
|-id=473 bgcolor=#fefefe
| 173473 ||  || — || September 3, 2000 || Socorro || LINEAR || FLO || align=right data-sort-value="0.91" | 910 m || 
|-id=474 bgcolor=#FA8072
| 173474 ||  || — || September 6, 2000 || Socorro || LINEAR || — || align=right | 1.9 km || 
|-id=475 bgcolor=#FA8072
| 173475 ||  || — || September 18, 2000 || Socorro || LINEAR || PHO || align=right | 2.1 km || 
|-id=476 bgcolor=#fefefe
| 173476 ||  || — || September 23, 2000 || Socorro || LINEAR || FLO || align=right data-sort-value="0.85" | 850 m || 
|-id=477 bgcolor=#d6d6d6
| 173477 ||  || — || September 24, 2000 || Socorro || LINEAR || THM || align=right | 5.3 km || 
|-id=478 bgcolor=#d6d6d6
| 173478 ||  || — || September 24, 2000 || Socorro || LINEAR || EOS || align=right | 3.8 km || 
|-id=479 bgcolor=#d6d6d6
| 173479 ||  || — || September 23, 2000 || Socorro || LINEAR || EOS || align=right | 3.6 km || 
|-id=480 bgcolor=#d6d6d6
| 173480 ||  || — || September 24, 2000 || Socorro || LINEAR || HYG || align=right | 5.0 km || 
|-id=481 bgcolor=#fefefe
| 173481 ||  || — || September 24, 2000 || Socorro || LINEAR || — || align=right | 1.4 km || 
|-id=482 bgcolor=#d6d6d6
| 173482 ||  || — || September 24, 2000 || Socorro || LINEAR || — || align=right | 4.1 km || 
|-id=483 bgcolor=#fefefe
| 173483 ||  || — || September 24, 2000 || Socorro || LINEAR || FLO || align=right data-sort-value="0.93" | 930 m || 
|-id=484 bgcolor=#d6d6d6
| 173484 ||  || — || September 23, 2000 || Socorro || LINEAR || — || align=right | 5.0 km || 
|-id=485 bgcolor=#fefefe
| 173485 ||  || — || September 24, 2000 || Socorro || LINEAR || — || align=right | 1.0 km || 
|-id=486 bgcolor=#fefefe
| 173486 ||  || — || September 23, 2000 || Socorro || LINEAR || — || align=right | 1.4 km || 
|-id=487 bgcolor=#d6d6d6
| 173487 ||  || — || September 23, 2000 || Socorro || LINEAR || — || align=right | 5.1 km || 
|-id=488 bgcolor=#d6d6d6
| 173488 ||  || — || September 23, 2000 || Socorro || LINEAR || — || align=right | 5.5 km || 
|-id=489 bgcolor=#d6d6d6
| 173489 ||  || — || September 28, 2000 || Socorro || LINEAR || ALA || align=right | 7.0 km || 
|-id=490 bgcolor=#fefefe
| 173490 ||  || — || September 28, 2000 || Socorro || LINEAR || FLO || align=right | 1.3 km || 
|-id=491 bgcolor=#fefefe
| 173491 ||  || — || September 21, 2000 || Kitt Peak || Spacewatch || — || align=right | 1.2 km || 
|-id=492 bgcolor=#fefefe
| 173492 ||  || — || September 21, 2000 || Haleakala || NEAT || — || align=right | 1.3 km || 
|-id=493 bgcolor=#d6d6d6
| 173493 ||  || — || September 25, 2000 || Socorro || LINEAR || HYG || align=right | 4.9 km || 
|-id=494 bgcolor=#d6d6d6
| 173494 ||  || — || September 24, 2000 || Socorro || LINEAR || — || align=right | 4.5 km || 
|-id=495 bgcolor=#fefefe
| 173495 ||  || — || September 28, 2000 || Socorro || LINEAR || FLO || align=right | 1.1 km || 
|-id=496 bgcolor=#fefefe
| 173496 ||  || — || September 23, 2000 || Socorro || LINEAR || — || align=right | 1.1 km || 
|-id=497 bgcolor=#fefefe
| 173497 ||  || — || September 28, 2000 || Socorro || LINEAR || — || align=right data-sort-value="0.95" | 950 m || 
|-id=498 bgcolor=#d6d6d6
| 173498 ||  || — || September 30, 2000 || Socorro || LINEAR || — || align=right | 7.9 km || 
|-id=499 bgcolor=#d6d6d6
| 173499 ||  || — || September 25, 2000 || Socorro || LINEAR || — || align=right | 8.0 km || 
|-id=500 bgcolor=#d6d6d6
| 173500 ||  || — || September 26, 2000 || Socorro || LINEAR || EUP || align=right | 6.8 km || 
|}

173501–173600 

|-bgcolor=#d6d6d6
| 173501 ||  || — || September 27, 2000 || Socorro || LINEAR || — || align=right | 6.0 km || 
|-id=502 bgcolor=#fefefe
| 173502 ||  || — || September 28, 2000 || Anderson Mesa || LONEOS || — || align=right | 1.1 km || 
|-id=503 bgcolor=#d6d6d6
| 173503 ||  || — || October 1, 2000 || Socorro || LINEAR || — || align=right | 4.6 km || 
|-id=504 bgcolor=#d6d6d6
| 173504 ||  || — || October 1, 2000 || Socorro || LINEAR || EOS || align=right | 5.8 km || 
|-id=505 bgcolor=#fefefe
| 173505 ||  || — || October 24, 2000 || Socorro || LINEAR || — || align=right | 1.9 km || 
|-id=506 bgcolor=#fefefe
| 173506 ||  || — || October 24, 2000 || Socorro || LINEAR || — || align=right | 1.2 km || 
|-id=507 bgcolor=#fefefe
| 173507 ||  || — || October 24, 2000 || Socorro || LINEAR || FLO || align=right | 1.4 km || 
|-id=508 bgcolor=#fefefe
| 173508 ||  || — || October 24, 2000 || Socorro || LINEAR || — || align=right | 1.4 km || 
|-id=509 bgcolor=#fefefe
| 173509 ||  || — || October 24, 2000 || Socorro || LINEAR || — || align=right | 2.0 km || 
|-id=510 bgcolor=#fefefe
| 173510 ||  || — || October 25, 2000 || Socorro || LINEAR || — || align=right data-sort-value="0.91" | 910 m || 
|-id=511 bgcolor=#fefefe
| 173511 ||  || — || October 25, 2000 || Socorro || LINEAR || — || align=right | 1.6 km || 
|-id=512 bgcolor=#fefefe
| 173512 ||  || — || October 25, 2000 || Socorro || LINEAR || — || align=right | 1.3 km || 
|-id=513 bgcolor=#d6d6d6
| 173513 ||  || — || October 25, 2000 || Socorro || LINEAR || — || align=right | 6.1 km || 
|-id=514 bgcolor=#fefefe
| 173514 ||  || — || October 25, 2000 || Socorro || LINEAR || — || align=right | 1.3 km || 
|-id=515 bgcolor=#fefefe
| 173515 ||  || — || October 24, 2000 || Socorro || LINEAR || — || align=right | 1.3 km || 
|-id=516 bgcolor=#fefefe
| 173516 ||  || — || October 31, 2000 || Socorro || LINEAR || — || align=right data-sort-value="0.96" | 960 m || 
|-id=517 bgcolor=#fefefe
| 173517 ||  || — || October 29, 2000 || Socorro || LINEAR || — || align=right | 1.4 km || 
|-id=518 bgcolor=#fefefe
| 173518 ||  || — || October 30, 2000 || Socorro || LINEAR || FLO || align=right | 1.0 km || 
|-id=519 bgcolor=#fefefe
| 173519 ||  || — || November 1, 2000 || Socorro || LINEAR || — || align=right | 1.2 km || 
|-id=520 bgcolor=#fefefe
| 173520 ||  || — || November 1, 2000 || Socorro || LINEAR || — || align=right | 1.4 km || 
|-id=521 bgcolor=#fefefe
| 173521 ||  || — || November 1, 2000 || Socorro || LINEAR || — || align=right | 2.5 km || 
|-id=522 bgcolor=#fefefe
| 173522 ||  || — || November 1, 2000 || Socorro || LINEAR || — || align=right | 1.2 km || 
|-id=523 bgcolor=#fefefe
| 173523 ||  || — || November 2, 2000 || Socorro || LINEAR || — || align=right | 1.2 km || 
|-id=524 bgcolor=#d6d6d6
| 173524 ||  || — || November 3, 2000 || Socorro || LINEAR || — || align=right | 6.2 km || 
|-id=525 bgcolor=#fefefe
| 173525 ||  || — || November 3, 2000 || Socorro || LINEAR || FLO || align=right | 1.2 km || 
|-id=526 bgcolor=#fefefe
| 173526 ||  || — || November 3, 2000 || Socorro || LINEAR || — || align=right | 1.6 km || 
|-id=527 bgcolor=#fefefe
| 173527 ||  || — || November 1, 2000 || Desert Beaver || W. K. Y. Yeung || FLO || align=right | 1.1 km || 
|-id=528 bgcolor=#fefefe
| 173528 ||  || — || November 17, 2000 || Kitt Peak || Spacewatch || — || align=right | 1.0 km || 
|-id=529 bgcolor=#d6d6d6
| 173529 ||  || — || November 19, 2000 || Socorro || LINEAR || — || align=right | 9.5 km || 
|-id=530 bgcolor=#FA8072
| 173530 ||  || — || November 21, 2000 || Socorro || LINEAR || — || align=right | 1.2 km || 
|-id=531 bgcolor=#fefefe
| 173531 ||  || — || November 20, 2000 || Socorro || LINEAR || — || align=right | 3.1 km || 
|-id=532 bgcolor=#fefefe
| 173532 ||  || — || November 20, 2000 || Socorro || LINEAR || — || align=right | 1.4 km || 
|-id=533 bgcolor=#fefefe
| 173533 ||  || — || November 21, 2000 || Socorro || LINEAR || FLO || align=right | 1.1 km || 
|-id=534 bgcolor=#fefefe
| 173534 ||  || — || November 19, 2000 || Socorro || LINEAR || FLO || align=right data-sort-value="0.97" | 970 m || 
|-id=535 bgcolor=#fefefe
| 173535 ||  || — || November 20, 2000 || Socorro || LINEAR || — || align=right | 1.0 km || 
|-id=536 bgcolor=#fefefe
| 173536 ||  || — || November 20, 2000 || Socorro || LINEAR || FLO || align=right | 1.0 km || 
|-id=537 bgcolor=#fefefe
| 173537 ||  || — || November 20, 2000 || Socorro || LINEAR || FLO || align=right | 1.2 km || 
|-id=538 bgcolor=#fefefe
| 173538 ||  || — || November 20, 2000 || Socorro || LINEAR || FLO || align=right | 1.2 km || 
|-id=539 bgcolor=#fefefe
| 173539 ||  || — || November 19, 2000 || Kitt Peak || Spacewatch || — || align=right | 1.3 km || 
|-id=540 bgcolor=#fefefe
| 173540 ||  || — || November 18, 2000 || Socorro || LINEAR || PHO || align=right | 2.3 km || 
|-id=541 bgcolor=#fefefe
| 173541 ||  || — || November 19, 2000 || Socorro || LINEAR || — || align=right | 1.3 km || 
|-id=542 bgcolor=#fefefe
| 173542 ||  || — || November 21, 2000 || Socorro || LINEAR || MAS || align=right | 1.3 km || 
|-id=543 bgcolor=#d6d6d6
| 173543 ||  || — || November 25, 2000 || Haleakala || NEAT || 3:2 || align=right | 6.7 km || 
|-id=544 bgcolor=#fefefe
| 173544 ||  || — || November 25, 2000 || Socorro || LINEAR || PHO || align=right | 3.1 km || 
|-id=545 bgcolor=#fefefe
| 173545 ||  || — || November 26, 2000 || Socorro || LINEAR || — || align=right | 1.4 km || 
|-id=546 bgcolor=#fefefe
| 173546 ||  || — || December 4, 2000 || Socorro || LINEAR || — || align=right | 1.6 km || 
|-id=547 bgcolor=#fefefe
| 173547 ||  || — || December 4, 2000 || Socorro || LINEAR || — || align=right | 1.5 km || 
|-id=548 bgcolor=#fefefe
| 173548 ||  || — || December 4, 2000 || Socorro || LINEAR || — || align=right | 1.5 km || 
|-id=549 bgcolor=#FA8072
| 173549 ||  || — || December 15, 2000 || Socorro || LINEAR || PHO || align=right | 1.8 km || 
|-id=550 bgcolor=#fefefe
| 173550 ||  || — || December 6, 2000 || Socorro || LINEAR || V || align=right | 1.1 km || 
|-id=551 bgcolor=#fefefe
| 173551 ||  || — || December 27, 2000 || Oaxaca || J. M. Roe || V || align=right | 1.1 km || 
|-id=552 bgcolor=#fefefe
| 173552 ||  || — || December 30, 2000 || Socorro || LINEAR || NYS || align=right | 1.0 km || 
|-id=553 bgcolor=#fefefe
| 173553 ||  || — || December 30, 2000 || Socorro || LINEAR || — || align=right | 1.0 km || 
|-id=554 bgcolor=#fefefe
| 173554 ||  || — || December 30, 2000 || Socorro || LINEAR || — || align=right | 1.3 km || 
|-id=555 bgcolor=#fefefe
| 173555 ||  || — || December 30, 2000 || Socorro || LINEAR || — || align=right | 1.4 km || 
|-id=556 bgcolor=#fefefe
| 173556 ||  || — || December 29, 2000 || Anderson Mesa || LONEOS || — || align=right | 1.5 km || 
|-id=557 bgcolor=#fefefe
| 173557 ||  || — || December 29, 2000 || Haleakala || NEAT || — || align=right | 1.6 km || 
|-id=558 bgcolor=#fefefe
| 173558 ||  || — || December 29, 2000 || Haleakala || NEAT || V || align=right | 1.2 km || 
|-id=559 bgcolor=#fefefe
| 173559 ||  || — || December 29, 2000 || Haleakala || NEAT || — || align=right | 1.2 km || 
|-id=560 bgcolor=#fefefe
| 173560 ||  || — || December 29, 2000 || Haleakala || NEAT || — || align=right | 1.6 km || 
|-id=561 bgcolor=#FFC2E0
| 173561 ||  || — || December 31, 2000 || Haleakala || NEAT || APOPHA || align=right data-sort-value="0.77" | 770 m || 
|-id=562 bgcolor=#fefefe
| 173562 ||  || — || January 2, 2001 || Socorro || LINEAR || — || align=right | 1.4 km || 
|-id=563 bgcolor=#fefefe
| 173563 ||  || — || January 2, 2001 || Socorro || LINEAR || — || align=right | 1.6 km || 
|-id=564 bgcolor=#fefefe
| 173564 ||  || — || January 3, 2001 || Socorro || LINEAR || — || align=right | 2.4 km || 
|-id=565 bgcolor=#fefefe
| 173565 ||  || — || January 5, 2001 || Socorro || LINEAR || — || align=right | 1.3 km || 
|-id=566 bgcolor=#fefefe
| 173566 ||  || — || January 3, 2001 || Anderson Mesa || LONEOS || V || align=right data-sort-value="0.95" | 950 m || 
|-id=567 bgcolor=#fefefe
| 173567 ||  || — || January 16, 2001 || Kitt Peak || Spacewatch || — || align=right | 1.5 km || 
|-id=568 bgcolor=#fefefe
| 173568 ||  || — || January 21, 2001 || Socorro || LINEAR || — || align=right data-sort-value="0.98" | 980 m || 
|-id=569 bgcolor=#fefefe
| 173569 ||  || — || January 19, 2001 || Socorro || LINEAR || — || align=right | 1.3 km || 
|-id=570 bgcolor=#fefefe
| 173570 ||  || — || January 20, 2001 || Socorro || LINEAR || FLO || align=right data-sort-value="0.90" | 900 m || 
|-id=571 bgcolor=#fefefe
| 173571 ||  || — || January 20, 2001 || Socorro || LINEAR || FLO || align=right | 1.1 km || 
|-id=572 bgcolor=#fefefe
| 173572 ||  || — || January 20, 2001 || Socorro || LINEAR || — || align=right | 1.7 km || 
|-id=573 bgcolor=#fefefe
| 173573 ||  || — || January 20, 2001 || Socorro || LINEAR || — || align=right | 1.3 km || 
|-id=574 bgcolor=#fefefe
| 173574 ||  || — || January 19, 2001 || Kitt Peak || Spacewatch || — || align=right | 1.2 km || 
|-id=575 bgcolor=#fefefe
| 173575 ||  || — || January 27, 2001 || Ondřejov || P. Pravec, P. Kušnirák || V || align=right | 1.2 km || 
|-id=576 bgcolor=#fefefe
| 173576 ||  || — || January 19, 2001 || Socorro || LINEAR || — || align=right | 3.4 km || 
|-id=577 bgcolor=#fefefe
| 173577 ||  || — || January 29, 2001 || Socorro || LINEAR || NYS || align=right | 1.7 km || 
|-id=578 bgcolor=#fefefe
| 173578 ||  || — || January 31, 2001 || Socorro || LINEAR || — || align=right | 1.5 km || 
|-id=579 bgcolor=#fefefe
| 173579 ||  || — || January 29, 2001 || Kvistaberg || UDAS || NYS || align=right | 2.0 km || 
|-id=580 bgcolor=#fefefe
| 173580 ||  || — || February 1, 2001 || Socorro || LINEAR || — || align=right | 2.6 km || 
|-id=581 bgcolor=#fefefe
| 173581 ||  || — || February 1, 2001 || Socorro || LINEAR || V || align=right | 1.2 km || 
|-id=582 bgcolor=#fefefe
| 173582 ||  || — || February 1, 2001 || Socorro || LINEAR || — || align=right | 2.9 km || 
|-id=583 bgcolor=#fefefe
| 173583 ||  || — || February 1, 2001 || Socorro || LINEAR || V || align=right | 1.3 km || 
|-id=584 bgcolor=#fefefe
| 173584 ||  || — || February 1, 2001 || Socorro || LINEAR || FLO || align=right | 1.6 km || 
|-id=585 bgcolor=#fefefe
| 173585 ||  || — || February 1, 2001 || Socorro || LINEAR || FLO || align=right | 1.1 km || 
|-id=586 bgcolor=#fefefe
| 173586 ||  || — || February 1, 2001 || Anderson Mesa || LONEOS || FLO || align=right data-sort-value="0.93" | 930 m || 
|-id=587 bgcolor=#fefefe
| 173587 ||  || — || February 1, 2001 || Anderson Mesa || LONEOS || NYS || align=right data-sort-value="0.85" | 850 m || 
|-id=588 bgcolor=#fefefe
| 173588 ||  || — || February 16, 2001 || Socorro || LINEAR || — || align=right | 1.2 km || 
|-id=589 bgcolor=#fefefe
| 173589 ||  || — || February 17, 2001 || Socorro || LINEAR || EUT || align=right data-sort-value="0.87" | 870 m || 
|-id=590 bgcolor=#fefefe
| 173590 ||  || — || February 17, 2001 || Socorro || LINEAR || — || align=right | 2.1 km || 
|-id=591 bgcolor=#fefefe
| 173591 ||  || — || February 17, 2001 || Socorro || LINEAR || — || align=right | 1.3 km || 
|-id=592 bgcolor=#fefefe
| 173592 ||  || — || February 17, 2001 || Socorro || LINEAR || — || align=right | 1.3 km || 
|-id=593 bgcolor=#fefefe
| 173593 ||  || — || February 17, 2001 || Socorro || LINEAR || V || align=right | 1.1 km || 
|-id=594 bgcolor=#fefefe
| 173594 ||  || — || February 17, 2001 || Socorro || LINEAR || FLO || align=right | 1.1 km || 
|-id=595 bgcolor=#E9E9E9
| 173595 ||  || — || February 19, 2001 || Socorro || LINEAR || — || align=right | 3.4 km || 
|-id=596 bgcolor=#fefefe
| 173596 ||  || — || February 19, 2001 || Prescott || P. G. Comba || — || align=right | 1.2 km || 
|-id=597 bgcolor=#fefefe
| 173597 ||  || — || February 16, 2001 || Socorro || LINEAR || — || align=right | 1.2 km || 
|-id=598 bgcolor=#fefefe
| 173598 ||  || — || February 16, 2001 || Socorro || LINEAR || — || align=right | 1.2 km || 
|-id=599 bgcolor=#fefefe
| 173599 ||  || — || February 19, 2001 || Socorro || LINEAR || — || align=right | 1.1 km || 
|-id=600 bgcolor=#fefefe
| 173600 ||  || — || February 16, 2001 || Kitt Peak || Spacewatch || EUT || align=right | 1.2 km || 
|}

173601–173700 

|-bgcolor=#fefefe
| 173601 ||  || — || February 17, 2001 || Socorro || LINEAR || — || align=right | 1.2 km || 
|-id=602 bgcolor=#fefefe
| 173602 ||  || — || February 19, 2001 || Socorro || LINEAR || NYS || align=right | 1.3 km || 
|-id=603 bgcolor=#fefefe
| 173603 ||  || — || February 20, 2001 || Socorro || LINEAR || — || align=right | 1.2 km || 
|-id=604 bgcolor=#fefefe
| 173604 ||  || — || February 16, 2001 || Socorro || LINEAR || — || align=right | 1.5 km || 
|-id=605 bgcolor=#fefefe
| 173605 ||  || — || March 2, 2001 || Anderson Mesa || LONEOS || NYS || align=right | 1.1 km || 
|-id=606 bgcolor=#fefefe
| 173606 ||  || — || March 2, 2001 || Anderson Mesa || LONEOS || EUT || align=right | 1.1 km || 
|-id=607 bgcolor=#fefefe
| 173607 ||  || — || March 2, 2001 || Haleakala || NEAT || — || align=right | 1.8 km || 
|-id=608 bgcolor=#fefefe
| 173608 ||  || — || March 13, 2001 || Socorro || LINEAR || — || align=right | 1.5 km || 
|-id=609 bgcolor=#fefefe
| 173609 ||  || — || March 15, 2001 || Anderson Mesa || LONEOS || V || align=right | 1.2 km || 
|-id=610 bgcolor=#fefefe
| 173610 ||  || — || March 18, 2001 || Socorro || LINEAR || — || align=right | 1.4 km || 
|-id=611 bgcolor=#fefefe
| 173611 ||  || — || March 19, 2001 || Socorro || LINEAR || — || align=right | 1.3 km || 
|-id=612 bgcolor=#fefefe
| 173612 ||  || — || March 19, 2001 || Anderson Mesa || LONEOS || — || align=right | 1.7 km || 
|-id=613 bgcolor=#fefefe
| 173613 ||  || — || March 19, 2001 || Anderson Mesa || LONEOS || — || align=right | 1.5 km || 
|-id=614 bgcolor=#fefefe
| 173614 ||  || — || March 17, 2001 || Socorro || LINEAR || PHO || align=right | 2.4 km || 
|-id=615 bgcolor=#fefefe
| 173615 ||  || — || March 18, 2001 || Socorro || LINEAR || ERI || align=right | 3.1 km || 
|-id=616 bgcolor=#fefefe
| 173616 ||  || — || March 18, 2001 || Socorro || LINEAR || FLO || align=right | 1.2 km || 
|-id=617 bgcolor=#fefefe
| 173617 ||  || — || March 18, 2001 || Socorro || LINEAR || SUL || align=right | 2.7 km || 
|-id=618 bgcolor=#fefefe
| 173618 ||  || — || March 18, 2001 || Socorro || LINEAR || — || align=right | 1.4 km || 
|-id=619 bgcolor=#fefefe
| 173619 ||  || — || March 18, 2001 || Socorro || LINEAR || — || align=right | 1.1 km || 
|-id=620 bgcolor=#fefefe
| 173620 ||  || — || March 18, 2001 || Socorro || LINEAR || NYS || align=right | 1.1 km || 
|-id=621 bgcolor=#fefefe
| 173621 ||  || — || March 18, 2001 || Socorro || LINEAR || — || align=right | 1.4 km || 
|-id=622 bgcolor=#fefefe
| 173622 ||  || — || March 18, 2001 || Socorro || LINEAR || NYS || align=right | 1.0 km || 
|-id=623 bgcolor=#fefefe
| 173623 ||  || — || March 18, 2001 || Socorro || LINEAR || — || align=right | 1.5 km || 
|-id=624 bgcolor=#fefefe
| 173624 ||  || — || March 18, 2001 || Socorro || LINEAR || — || align=right | 1.1 km || 
|-id=625 bgcolor=#fefefe
| 173625 ||  || — || March 21, 2001 || Haleakala || NEAT || NYS || align=right | 1.3 km || 
|-id=626 bgcolor=#fefefe
| 173626 ||  || — || March 19, 2001 || Socorro || LINEAR || NYS || align=right | 1.2 km || 
|-id=627 bgcolor=#fefefe
| 173627 ||  || — || March 19, 2001 || Socorro || LINEAR || MAS || align=right | 1.2 km || 
|-id=628 bgcolor=#fefefe
| 173628 ||  || — || March 19, 2001 || Socorro || LINEAR || NYS || align=right | 1.1 km || 
|-id=629 bgcolor=#fefefe
| 173629 ||  || — || March 19, 2001 || Socorro || LINEAR || — || align=right | 1.5 km || 
|-id=630 bgcolor=#fefefe
| 173630 ||  || — || March 19, 2001 || Socorro || LINEAR || — || align=right | 2.9 km || 
|-id=631 bgcolor=#fefefe
| 173631 ||  || — || March 21, 2001 || Anderson Mesa || LONEOS || — || align=right | 1.5 km || 
|-id=632 bgcolor=#fefefe
| 173632 ||  || — || March 21, 2001 || Anderson Mesa || LONEOS || NYS || align=right | 1.0 km || 
|-id=633 bgcolor=#fefefe
| 173633 ||  || — || March 16, 2001 || Socorro || LINEAR || ERI || align=right | 2.7 km || 
|-id=634 bgcolor=#fefefe
| 173634 ||  || — || March 18, 2001 || Anderson Mesa || LONEOS || — || align=right | 2.2 km || 
|-id=635 bgcolor=#fefefe
| 173635 ||  || — || March 18, 2001 || Socorro || LINEAR || FLO || align=right data-sort-value="0.94" | 940 m || 
|-id=636 bgcolor=#fefefe
| 173636 ||  || — || March 18, 2001 || Anderson Mesa || LONEOS || — || align=right | 1.4 km || 
|-id=637 bgcolor=#fefefe
| 173637 ||  || — || March 23, 2001 || Anderson Mesa || LONEOS || NYS || align=right | 1.1 km || 
|-id=638 bgcolor=#fefefe
| 173638 ||  || — || March 24, 2001 || Kitt Peak || Spacewatch || — || align=right | 1.2 km || 
|-id=639 bgcolor=#fefefe
| 173639 ||  || — || March 20, 2001 || Haleakala || NEAT || NYS || align=right | 1.3 km || 
|-id=640 bgcolor=#fefefe
| 173640 ||  || — || March 21, 2001 || Haleakala || NEAT || — || align=right | 1.2 km || 
|-id=641 bgcolor=#fefefe
| 173641 ||  || — || March 23, 2001 || Anderson Mesa || LONEOS || NYS || align=right data-sort-value="0.79" | 790 m || 
|-id=642 bgcolor=#fefefe
| 173642 ||  || — || March 24, 2001 || Anderson Mesa || LONEOS || — || align=right | 1.5 km || 
|-id=643 bgcolor=#d6d6d6
| 173643 ||  || — || March 22, 2001 || Cima Ekar || Asiago Obs. || SHU3:2 || align=right | 11 km || 
|-id=644 bgcolor=#fefefe
| 173644 ||  || — || March 29, 2001 || Haleakala || NEAT || — || align=right | 3.0 km || 
|-id=645 bgcolor=#fefefe
| 173645 ||  || — || March 18, 2001 || Anderson Mesa || LONEOS || — || align=right | 3.3 km || 
|-id=646 bgcolor=#fefefe
| 173646 ||  || — || March 24, 2001 || Socorro || LINEAR || NYS || align=right | 1.2 km || 
|-id=647 bgcolor=#fefefe
| 173647 ||  || — || March 24, 2001 || Haleakala || NEAT || — || align=right | 2.0 km || 
|-id=648 bgcolor=#fefefe
| 173648 ||  || — || March 24, 2001 || Haleakala || NEAT || — || align=right | 1.4 km || 
|-id=649 bgcolor=#E9E9E9
| 173649 Jeffreymoore ||  ||  || March 26, 2001 || Kitt Peak || M. W. Buie || — || align=right | 1.5 km || 
|-id=650 bgcolor=#fefefe
| 173650 ||  || — || March 18, 2001 || Anderson Mesa || LONEOS || FLO || align=right | 1.1 km || 
|-id=651 bgcolor=#fefefe
| 173651 ||  || — || March 18, 2001 || Haleakala || NEAT || V || align=right | 1.2 km || 
|-id=652 bgcolor=#fefefe
| 173652 ||  || — || March 18, 2001 || Anderson Mesa || LONEOS || V || align=right | 1.2 km || 
|-id=653 bgcolor=#fefefe
| 173653 ||  || — || April 14, 2001 || Socorro || LINEAR || PHO || align=right | 1.8 km || 
|-id=654 bgcolor=#fefefe
| 173654 ||  || — || April 17, 2001 || Socorro || LINEAR || — || align=right | 1.8 km || 
|-id=655 bgcolor=#fefefe
| 173655 ||  || — || April 18, 2001 || Socorro || LINEAR || NYS || align=right | 1.5 km || 
|-id=656 bgcolor=#fefefe
| 173656 ||  || — || April 18, 2001 || Socorro || LINEAR || MAS || align=right | 1.3 km || 
|-id=657 bgcolor=#fefefe
| 173657 ||  || — || April 21, 2001 || Kitt Peak || Spacewatch || CLA || align=right | 2.3 km || 
|-id=658 bgcolor=#fefefe
| 173658 ||  || — || April 27, 2001 || Desert Beaver || W. K. Y. Yeung || NYS || align=right | 1.3 km || 
|-id=659 bgcolor=#fefefe
| 173659 ||  || — || April 27, 2001 || Desert Beaver || W. K. Y. Yeung || — || align=right | 1.7 km || 
|-id=660 bgcolor=#fefefe
| 173660 ||  || — || April 23, 2001 || Socorro || LINEAR || NYS || align=right | 1.3 km || 
|-id=661 bgcolor=#fefefe
| 173661 ||  || — || April 24, 2001 || Haleakala || NEAT || — || align=right | 1.3 km || 
|-id=662 bgcolor=#fefefe
| 173662 ||  || — || April 26, 2001 || Anderson Mesa || LONEOS || NYS || align=right | 1.3 km || 
|-id=663 bgcolor=#fefefe
| 173663 ||  || — || April 27, 2001 || Socorro || LINEAR || MAS || align=right | 1.2 km || 
|-id=664 bgcolor=#FFC2E0
| 173664 ||  || — || May 15, 2001 || Anderson Mesa || LONEOS || AMO || align=right data-sort-value="0.41" | 410 m || 
|-id=665 bgcolor=#fefefe
| 173665 ||  || — || May 17, 2001 || Socorro || LINEAR || NYS || align=right | 1.1 km || 
|-id=666 bgcolor=#fefefe
| 173666 ||  || — || May 17, 2001 || Socorro || LINEAR || NYS || align=right | 1.2 km || 
|-id=667 bgcolor=#fefefe
| 173667 ||  || — || May 18, 2001 || Socorro || LINEAR || NYS || align=right | 1.4 km || 
|-id=668 bgcolor=#E9E9E9
| 173668 ||  || — || May 22, 2001 || Socorro || LINEAR || — || align=right | 4.0 km || 
|-id=669 bgcolor=#fefefe
| 173669 ||  || — || May 18, 2001 || Anderson Mesa || LONEOS || — || align=right | 1.6 km || 
|-id=670 bgcolor=#E9E9E9
| 173670 ||  || — || June 15, 2001 || Socorro || LINEAR || EUN || align=right | 1.8 km || 
|-id=671 bgcolor=#E9E9E9
| 173671 ||  || — || June 27, 2001 || Palomar || NEAT || — || align=right | 2.9 km || 
|-id=672 bgcolor=#E9E9E9
| 173672 ||  || — || July 12, 2001 || Palomar || NEAT || — || align=right | 2.0 km || 
|-id=673 bgcolor=#E9E9E9
| 173673 ||  || — || July 14, 2001 || Haleakala || NEAT || PAE || align=right | 6.0 km || 
|-id=674 bgcolor=#E9E9E9
| 173674 ||  || — || July 18, 2001 || Palomar || NEAT || — || align=right | 2.7 km || 
|-id=675 bgcolor=#E9E9E9
| 173675 ||  || — || July 17, 2001 || Anderson Mesa || LONEOS || — || align=right | 5.6 km || 
|-id=676 bgcolor=#d6d6d6
| 173676 ||  || — || July 18, 2001 || Palomar || NEAT || — || align=right | 4.5 km || 
|-id=677 bgcolor=#fefefe
| 173677 ||  || — || July 17, 2001 || Haleakala || NEAT || H || align=right data-sort-value="0.92" | 920 m || 
|-id=678 bgcolor=#E9E9E9
| 173678 ||  || — || July 18, 2001 || Palomar || NEAT || — || align=right | 4.8 km || 
|-id=679 bgcolor=#d6d6d6
| 173679 ||  || — || July 20, 2001 || Palomar || NEAT || — || align=right | 5.3 km || 
|-id=680 bgcolor=#E9E9E9
| 173680 ||  || — || July 16, 2001 || Anderson Mesa || LONEOS || HNA || align=right | 3.9 km || 
|-id=681 bgcolor=#E9E9E9
| 173681 ||  || — || July 20, 2001 || Palomar || NEAT || DOR || align=right | 2.7 km || 
|-id=682 bgcolor=#E9E9E9
| 173682 ||  || — || July 21, 2001 || Haleakala || NEAT || — || align=right | 2.1 km || 
|-id=683 bgcolor=#E9E9E9
| 173683 ||  || — || July 27, 2001 || Anderson Mesa || LONEOS || — || align=right | 2.6 km || 
|-id=684 bgcolor=#E9E9E9
| 173684 ||  || — || July 27, 2001 || Anderson Mesa || LONEOS || — || align=right | 3.0 km || 
|-id=685 bgcolor=#d6d6d6
| 173685 ||  || — || July 29, 2001 || Socorro || LINEAR || — || align=right | 4.8 km || 
|-id=686 bgcolor=#E9E9E9
| 173686 ||  || — || July 25, 2001 || Haleakala || NEAT || — || align=right | 1.9 km || 
|-id=687 bgcolor=#E9E9E9
| 173687 ||  || — || July 26, 2001 || Haleakala || NEAT || — || align=right | 4.0 km || 
|-id=688 bgcolor=#E9E9E9
| 173688 ||  || — || August 10, 2001 || Palomar || NEAT || — || align=right | 2.0 km || 
|-id=689 bgcolor=#FFC2E0
| 173689 ||  || — || August 10, 2001 || Palomar || NEAT || AMO +1km || align=right data-sort-value="0.81" | 810 m || 
|-id=690 bgcolor=#E9E9E9
| 173690 ||  || — || August 9, 2001 || Palomar || NEAT || — || align=right | 3.5 km || 
|-id=691 bgcolor=#E9E9E9
| 173691 ||  || — || August 10, 2001 || Palomar || NEAT || — || align=right | 2.2 km || 
|-id=692 bgcolor=#E9E9E9
| 173692 ||  || — || August 10, 2001 || Palomar || NEAT || GEF || align=right | 2.4 km || 
|-id=693 bgcolor=#d6d6d6
| 173693 ||  || — || August 11, 2001 || Palomar || NEAT || — || align=right | 4.8 km || 
|-id=694 bgcolor=#d6d6d6
| 173694 ||  || — || August 11, 2001 || Palomar || NEAT || — || align=right | 4.2 km || 
|-id=695 bgcolor=#E9E9E9
| 173695 ||  || — || August 8, 2001 || Haleakala || NEAT || HNS || align=right | 2.8 km || 
|-id=696 bgcolor=#fefefe
| 173696 || 2001 QN || — || August 16, 2001 || Socorro || LINEAR || H || align=right data-sort-value="0.99" | 990 m || 
|-id=697 bgcolor=#d6d6d6
| 173697 ||  || — || August 16, 2001 || Socorro || LINEAR || TRP || align=right | 4.9 km || 
|-id=698 bgcolor=#E9E9E9
| 173698 ||  || — || August 16, 2001 || Socorro || LINEAR || — || align=right | 1.8 km || 
|-id=699 bgcolor=#E9E9E9
| 173699 ||  || — || August 16, 2001 || Socorro || LINEAR || — || align=right | 3.9 km || 
|-id=700 bgcolor=#E9E9E9
| 173700 ||  || — || August 16, 2001 || Socorro || LINEAR || — || align=right | 3.2 km || 
|}

173701–173800 

|-bgcolor=#E9E9E9
| 173701 ||  || — || August 16, 2001 || Socorro || LINEAR || INO || align=right | 1.8 km || 
|-id=702 bgcolor=#E9E9E9
| 173702 ||  || — || August 16, 2001 || Socorro || LINEAR || — || align=right | 4.7 km || 
|-id=703 bgcolor=#d6d6d6
| 173703 ||  || — || August 16, 2001 || Socorro || LINEAR || Tj (2.99) || align=right | 5.2 km || 
|-id=704 bgcolor=#E9E9E9
| 173704 ||  || — || August 16, 2001 || Socorro || LINEAR || — || align=right | 1.9 km || 
|-id=705 bgcolor=#fefefe
| 173705 ||  || — || August 19, 2001 || Socorro || LINEAR || H || align=right | 1.2 km || 
|-id=706 bgcolor=#E9E9E9
| 173706 ||  || — || August 17, 2001 || Socorro || LINEAR || ADE || align=right | 4.4 km || 
|-id=707 bgcolor=#E9E9E9
| 173707 ||  || — || August 23, 2001 || Desert Eagle || W. K. Y. Yeung || AGN || align=right | 2.1 km || 
|-id=708 bgcolor=#E9E9E9
| 173708 ||  || — || August 23, 2001 || Desert Eagle || W. K. Y. Yeung || — || align=right | 3.5 km || 
|-id=709 bgcolor=#d6d6d6
| 173709 ||  || — || August 22, 2001 || Socorro || LINEAR || EUP || align=right | 8.3 km || 
|-id=710 bgcolor=#E9E9E9
| 173710 ||  || — || August 19, 2001 || Socorro || LINEAR || — || align=right | 3.5 km || 
|-id=711 bgcolor=#E9E9E9
| 173711 ||  || — || August 19, 2001 || Socorro || LINEAR || — || align=right | 3.7 km || 
|-id=712 bgcolor=#d6d6d6
| 173712 ||  || — || August 20, 2001 || Socorro || LINEAR || — || align=right | 7.1 km || 
|-id=713 bgcolor=#d6d6d6
| 173713 ||  || — || August 22, 2001 || Socorro || LINEAR || — || align=right | 4.3 km || 
|-id=714 bgcolor=#d6d6d6
| 173714 ||  || — || August 22, 2001 || Socorro || LINEAR || — || align=right | 7.3 km || 
|-id=715 bgcolor=#d6d6d6
| 173715 ||  || — || August 21, 2001 || Kitt Peak || Spacewatch || KOR || align=right | 1.4 km || 
|-id=716 bgcolor=#E9E9E9
| 173716 ||  || — || August 21, 2001 || Haleakala || NEAT || — || align=right | 2.5 km || 
|-id=717 bgcolor=#d6d6d6
| 173717 ||  || — || August 26, 2001 || Socorro || LINEAR || EUP || align=right | 7.1 km || 
|-id=718 bgcolor=#d6d6d6
| 173718 ||  || — || August 27, 2001 || Ondřejov || P. Kušnirák || — || align=right | 2.9 km || 
|-id=719 bgcolor=#E9E9E9
| 173719 ||  || — || August 26, 2001 || Haleakala || NEAT || — || align=right | 3.9 km || 
|-id=720 bgcolor=#E9E9E9
| 173720 ||  || — || August 23, 2001 || Palomar || NEAT || PAE || align=right | 5.9 km || 
|-id=721 bgcolor=#E9E9E9
| 173721 ||  || — || August 22, 2001 || Kitt Peak || Spacewatch || — || align=right | 3.3 km || 
|-id=722 bgcolor=#d6d6d6
| 173722 ||  || — || August 22, 2001 || Socorro || LINEAR || TIR || align=right | 4.6 km || 
|-id=723 bgcolor=#d6d6d6
| 173723 ||  || — || August 22, 2001 || Socorro || LINEAR || — || align=right | 5.0 km || 
|-id=724 bgcolor=#d6d6d6
| 173724 ||  || — || August 22, 2001 || Palomar || NEAT || — || align=right | 4.3 km || 
|-id=725 bgcolor=#E9E9E9
| 173725 ||  || — || August 23, 2001 || Anderson Mesa || LONEOS || — || align=right | 2.4 km || 
|-id=726 bgcolor=#d6d6d6
| 173726 ||  || — || August 23, 2001 || Anderson Mesa || LONEOS || NAE || align=right | 4.6 km || 
|-id=727 bgcolor=#d6d6d6
| 173727 ||  || — || August 23, 2001 || Anderson Mesa || LONEOS || — || align=right | 4.4 km || 
|-id=728 bgcolor=#E9E9E9
| 173728 ||  || — || August 23, 2001 || Anderson Mesa || LONEOS || — || align=right | 3.7 km || 
|-id=729 bgcolor=#E9E9E9
| 173729 ||  || — || August 23, 2001 || Anderson Mesa || LONEOS || AGN || align=right | 2.2 km || 
|-id=730 bgcolor=#E9E9E9
| 173730 ||  || — || August 23, 2001 || Anderson Mesa || LONEOS || — || align=right | 2.8 km || 
|-id=731 bgcolor=#E9E9E9
| 173731 ||  || — || August 24, 2001 || Anderson Mesa || LONEOS || — || align=right | 2.5 km || 
|-id=732 bgcolor=#E9E9E9
| 173732 ||  || — || August 24, 2001 || Socorro || LINEAR || EUN || align=right | 2.0 km || 
|-id=733 bgcolor=#d6d6d6
| 173733 ||  || — || August 24, 2001 || Socorro || LINEAR || — || align=right | 4.6 km || 
|-id=734 bgcolor=#d6d6d6
| 173734 ||  || — || August 24, 2001 || Socorro || LINEAR || — || align=right | 4.6 km || 
|-id=735 bgcolor=#E9E9E9
| 173735 ||  || — || August 19, 2001 || Socorro || LINEAR || HNS || align=right | 2.0 km || 
|-id=736 bgcolor=#E9E9E9
| 173736 ||  || — || August 19, 2001 || Socorro || LINEAR || NEM || align=right | 2.7 km || 
|-id=737 bgcolor=#E9E9E9
| 173737 ||  || — || August 19, 2001 || Socorro || LINEAR || — || align=right | 3.4 km || 
|-id=738 bgcolor=#E9E9E9
| 173738 ||  || — || August 19, 2001 || Socorro || LINEAR || — || align=right | 3.5 km || 
|-id=739 bgcolor=#E9E9E9
| 173739 ||  || — || August 17, 2001 || Socorro || LINEAR || — || align=right | 3.3 km || 
|-id=740 bgcolor=#d6d6d6
| 173740 ||  || — || August 17, 2001 || Socorro || LINEAR || — || align=right | 3.8 km || 
|-id=741 bgcolor=#d6d6d6
| 173741 ||  || — || August 24, 2001 || Socorro || LINEAR || — || align=right | 5.0 km || 
|-id=742 bgcolor=#d6d6d6
| 173742 ||  || — || August 26, 2001 || Palomar || NEAT || — || align=right | 6.2 km || 
|-id=743 bgcolor=#d6d6d6
| 173743 ||  || — || August 29, 2001 || Palomar || NEAT || — || align=right | 5.4 km || 
|-id=744 bgcolor=#E9E9E9
| 173744 ||  || — || September 7, 2001 || Socorro || LINEAR || — || align=right | 3.3 km || 
|-id=745 bgcolor=#E9E9E9
| 173745 ||  || — || September 7, 2001 || Socorro || LINEAR || HOF || align=right | 4.6 km || 
|-id=746 bgcolor=#d6d6d6
| 173746 ||  || — || September 7, 2001 || Socorro || LINEAR || 628 || align=right | 2.7 km || 
|-id=747 bgcolor=#d6d6d6
| 173747 ||  || — || September 7, 2001 || Socorro || LINEAR || — || align=right | 4.3 km || 
|-id=748 bgcolor=#E9E9E9
| 173748 ||  || — || September 7, 2001 || Socorro || LINEAR || — || align=right | 3.6 km || 
|-id=749 bgcolor=#d6d6d6
| 173749 ||  || — || September 8, 2001 || Socorro || LINEAR || — || align=right | 4.4 km || 
|-id=750 bgcolor=#E9E9E9
| 173750 ||  || — || September 7, 2001 || Palomar || NEAT || — || align=right | 2.4 km || 
|-id=751 bgcolor=#E9E9E9
| 173751 ||  || — || September 12, 2001 || Goodricke-Pigott || R. A. Tucker || HOF || align=right | 4.8 km || 
|-id=752 bgcolor=#E9E9E9
| 173752 ||  || — || September 11, 2001 || Socorro || LINEAR || RAF || align=right | 1.8 km || 
|-id=753 bgcolor=#E9E9E9
| 173753 ||  || — || September 11, 2001 || Anderson Mesa || LONEOS || MAR || align=right | 2.0 km || 
|-id=754 bgcolor=#d6d6d6
| 173754 ||  || — || September 12, 2001 || Kitt Peak || Spacewatch || — || align=right | 6.6 km || 
|-id=755 bgcolor=#d6d6d6
| 173755 ||  || — || September 12, 2001 || Kitt Peak || Spacewatch || — || align=right | 4.6 km || 
|-id=756 bgcolor=#d6d6d6
| 173756 ||  || — || September 12, 2001 || Socorro || LINEAR || EOS || align=right | 3.1 km || 
|-id=757 bgcolor=#E9E9E9
| 173757 ||  || — || September 12, 2001 || Socorro || LINEAR || GEF || align=right | 2.3 km || 
|-id=758 bgcolor=#d6d6d6
| 173758 ||  || — || September 12, 2001 || Socorro || LINEAR || 615 || align=right | 2.0 km || 
|-id=759 bgcolor=#d6d6d6
| 173759 ||  || — || September 12, 2001 || Socorro || LINEAR || — || align=right | 3.9 km || 
|-id=760 bgcolor=#E9E9E9
| 173760 ||  || — || September 12, 2001 || Socorro || LINEAR || AST || align=right | 3.4 km || 
|-id=761 bgcolor=#E9E9E9
| 173761 ||  || — || September 12, 2001 || Socorro || LINEAR || — || align=right | 3.2 km || 
|-id=762 bgcolor=#d6d6d6
| 173762 ||  || — || September 12, 2001 || Socorro || LINEAR || KOR || align=right | 2.4 km || 
|-id=763 bgcolor=#d6d6d6
| 173763 ||  || — || September 12, 2001 || Socorro || LINEAR || KOR || align=right | 2.2 km || 
|-id=764 bgcolor=#E9E9E9
| 173764 ||  || — || September 12, 2001 || Socorro || LINEAR || WIT || align=right | 1.7 km || 
|-id=765 bgcolor=#d6d6d6
| 173765 ||  || — || September 12, 2001 || Socorro || LINEAR || — || align=right | 5.4 km || 
|-id=766 bgcolor=#E9E9E9
| 173766 ||  || — || September 12, 2001 || Socorro || LINEAR || EUN || align=right | 2.1 km || 
|-id=767 bgcolor=#d6d6d6
| 173767 ||  || — || September 12, 2001 || Socorro || LINEAR || EOS || align=right | 3.0 km || 
|-id=768 bgcolor=#d6d6d6
| 173768 ||  || — || September 15, 2001 || Palomar || NEAT || EOS || align=right | 3.5 km || 
|-id=769 bgcolor=#d6d6d6
| 173769 ||  || — || September 15, 2001 || Palomar || NEAT || — || align=right | 3.7 km || 
|-id=770 bgcolor=#E9E9E9
| 173770 ||  || — || September 11, 2001 || Anderson Mesa || LONEOS || AGN || align=right | 2.0 km || 
|-id=771 bgcolor=#d6d6d6
| 173771 ||  || — || September 11, 2001 || Anderson Mesa || LONEOS || — || align=right | 5.5 km || 
|-id=772 bgcolor=#d6d6d6
| 173772 ||  || — || September 11, 2001 || Socorro || LINEAR || — || align=right | 5.9 km || 
|-id=773 bgcolor=#d6d6d6
| 173773 ||  || — || September 15, 2001 || Palomar || NEAT || EOS || align=right | 3.2 km || 
|-id=774 bgcolor=#E9E9E9
| 173774 ||  || — || September 16, 2001 || Socorro || LINEAR || HOF || align=right | 5.1 km || 
|-id=775 bgcolor=#d6d6d6
| 173775 ||  || — || September 16, 2001 || Socorro || LINEAR || KOR || align=right | 2.3 km || 
|-id=776 bgcolor=#d6d6d6
| 173776 ||  || — || September 16, 2001 || Socorro || LINEAR || — || align=right | 4.4 km || 
|-id=777 bgcolor=#d6d6d6
| 173777 ||  || — || September 16, 2001 || Socorro || LINEAR || KOR || align=right | 2.4 km || 
|-id=778 bgcolor=#E9E9E9
| 173778 ||  || — || September 16, 2001 || Socorro || LINEAR || DOR || align=right | 3.9 km || 
|-id=779 bgcolor=#d6d6d6
| 173779 ||  || — || September 16, 2001 || Socorro || LINEAR || — || align=right | 4.1 km || 
|-id=780 bgcolor=#d6d6d6
| 173780 ||  || — || September 16, 2001 || Socorro || LINEAR || CHA || align=right | 3.4 km || 
|-id=781 bgcolor=#d6d6d6
| 173781 ||  || — || September 17, 2001 || Socorro || LINEAR || — || align=right | 4.3 km || 
|-id=782 bgcolor=#d6d6d6
| 173782 ||  || — || September 16, 2001 || Socorro || LINEAR || CHA || align=right | 3.1 km || 
|-id=783 bgcolor=#d6d6d6
| 173783 ||  || — || September 17, 2001 || Socorro || LINEAR || HYG || align=right | 4.0 km || 
|-id=784 bgcolor=#d6d6d6
| 173784 ||  || — || September 17, 2001 || Socorro || LINEAR || EOS || align=right | 3.3 km || 
|-id=785 bgcolor=#E9E9E9
| 173785 ||  || — || September 20, 2001 || Socorro || LINEAR || PAD || align=right | 4.6 km || 
|-id=786 bgcolor=#E9E9E9
| 173786 ||  || — || September 20, 2001 || Socorro || LINEAR || HOF || align=right | 4.4 km || 
|-id=787 bgcolor=#E9E9E9
| 173787 ||  || — || September 20, 2001 || Socorro || LINEAR || WIT || align=right | 1.8 km || 
|-id=788 bgcolor=#E9E9E9
| 173788 ||  || — || September 20, 2001 || Socorro || LINEAR || — || align=right | 2.8 km || 
|-id=789 bgcolor=#E9E9E9
| 173789 ||  || — || September 20, 2001 || Socorro || LINEAR || DOR || align=right | 4.2 km || 
|-id=790 bgcolor=#E9E9E9
| 173790 ||  || — || September 20, 2001 || Desert Eagle || W. K. Y. Yeung || MRX || align=right | 2.0 km || 
|-id=791 bgcolor=#d6d6d6
| 173791 ||  || — || September 16, 2001 || Socorro || LINEAR || — || align=right | 5.8 km || 
|-id=792 bgcolor=#d6d6d6
| 173792 ||  || — || September 16, 2001 || Socorro || LINEAR || — || align=right | 4.8 km || 
|-id=793 bgcolor=#E9E9E9
| 173793 ||  || — || September 16, 2001 || Socorro || LINEAR || — || align=right | 4.6 km || 
|-id=794 bgcolor=#d6d6d6
| 173794 ||  || — || September 16, 2001 || Socorro || LINEAR || — || align=right | 3.0 km || 
|-id=795 bgcolor=#d6d6d6
| 173795 ||  || — || September 16, 2001 || Socorro || LINEAR || THM || align=right | 3.6 km || 
|-id=796 bgcolor=#d6d6d6
| 173796 ||  || — || September 17, 2001 || Socorro || LINEAR || EOS || align=right | 3.5 km || 
|-id=797 bgcolor=#d6d6d6
| 173797 ||  || — || September 19, 2001 || Socorro || LINEAR || — || align=right | 4.6 km || 
|-id=798 bgcolor=#E9E9E9
| 173798 ||  || — || September 19, 2001 || Socorro || LINEAR || HEN || align=right | 1.6 km || 
|-id=799 bgcolor=#d6d6d6
| 173799 ||  || — || September 19, 2001 || Socorro || LINEAR || KOR || align=right | 2.2 km || 
|-id=800 bgcolor=#d6d6d6
| 173800 ||  || — || September 19, 2001 || Socorro || LINEAR || — || align=right | 3.9 km || 
|}

173801–173900 

|-bgcolor=#d6d6d6
| 173801 ||  || — || September 19, 2001 || Socorro || LINEAR || KOR || align=right | 1.9 km || 
|-id=802 bgcolor=#d6d6d6
| 173802 ||  || — || September 19, 2001 || Socorro || LINEAR || NAE || align=right | 5.4 km || 
|-id=803 bgcolor=#d6d6d6
| 173803 ||  || — || September 19, 2001 || Socorro || LINEAR || — || align=right | 4.5 km || 
|-id=804 bgcolor=#d6d6d6
| 173804 ||  || — || September 19, 2001 || Socorro || LINEAR || KOR || align=right | 2.1 km || 
|-id=805 bgcolor=#d6d6d6
| 173805 ||  || — || September 19, 2001 || Socorro || LINEAR || — || align=right | 3.6 km || 
|-id=806 bgcolor=#d6d6d6
| 173806 ||  || — || September 19, 2001 || Socorro || LINEAR || KOR || align=right | 1.8 km || 
|-id=807 bgcolor=#d6d6d6
| 173807 ||  || — || September 19, 2001 || Socorro || LINEAR || KOR || align=right | 1.9 km || 
|-id=808 bgcolor=#E9E9E9
| 173808 ||  || — || September 19, 2001 || Socorro || LINEAR || NEM || align=right | 3.2 km || 
|-id=809 bgcolor=#E9E9E9
| 173809 ||  || — || September 19, 2001 || Socorro || LINEAR || — || align=right | 3.4 km || 
|-id=810 bgcolor=#d6d6d6
| 173810 ||  || — || September 19, 2001 || Socorro || LINEAR || KOR || align=right | 2.3 km || 
|-id=811 bgcolor=#d6d6d6
| 173811 ||  || — || September 16, 2001 || Palomar || NEAT || — || align=right | 4.5 km || 
|-id=812 bgcolor=#d6d6d6
| 173812 ||  || — || September 21, 2001 || Anderson Mesa || LONEOS || ALA || align=right | 7.0 km || 
|-id=813 bgcolor=#E9E9E9
| 173813 ||  || — || September 20, 2001 || Kitt Peak || Spacewatch || HOF || align=right | 3.5 km || 
|-id=814 bgcolor=#E9E9E9
| 173814 ||  || — || September 16, 2001 || Socorro || LINEAR || — || align=right | 4.2 km || 
|-id=815 bgcolor=#d6d6d6
| 173815 ||  || — || September 20, 2001 || Socorro || LINEAR || KAR || align=right | 1.8 km || 
|-id=816 bgcolor=#d6d6d6
| 173816 ||  || — || September 20, 2001 || Socorro || LINEAR || — || align=right | 5.5 km || 
|-id=817 bgcolor=#E9E9E9
| 173817 ||  || — || September 20, 2001 || Socorro || LINEAR || MRX || align=right | 1.9 km || 
|-id=818 bgcolor=#d6d6d6
| 173818 ||  || — || September 25, 2001 || Socorro || LINEAR || TIR || align=right | 6.2 km || 
|-id=819 bgcolor=#d6d6d6
| 173819 ||  || — || September 26, 2001 || Socorro || LINEAR || — || align=right | 4.8 km || 
|-id=820 bgcolor=#E9E9E9
| 173820 ||  || — || September 19, 2001 || Socorro || LINEAR || — || align=right | 3.1 km || 
|-id=821 bgcolor=#E9E9E9
| 173821 ||  || — || September 20, 2001 || Socorro || LINEAR || — || align=right | 4.4 km || 
|-id=822 bgcolor=#E9E9E9
| 173822 ||  || — || September 20, 2001 || Socorro || LINEAR || — || align=right | 4.0 km || 
|-id=823 bgcolor=#d6d6d6
| 173823 ||  || — || September 21, 2001 || Kitt Peak || Spacewatch || — || align=right | 3.4 km || 
|-id=824 bgcolor=#d6d6d6
| 173824 ||  || — || September 23, 2001 || Palomar || NEAT || TIR || align=right | 5.3 km || 
|-id=825 bgcolor=#d6d6d6
| 173825 ||  || — || September 23, 2001 || Haleakala || NEAT || — || align=right | 5.4 km || 
|-id=826 bgcolor=#d6d6d6
| 173826 ||  || — || September 22, 2001 || Palomar || NEAT || — || align=right | 5.1 km || 
|-id=827 bgcolor=#d6d6d6
| 173827 ||  || — || October 14, 2001 || Desert Eagle || W. K. Y. Yeung || — || align=right | 7.4 km || 
|-id=828 bgcolor=#d6d6d6
| 173828 ||  || — || October 11, 2001 || Socorro || LINEAR || — || align=right | 4.1 km || 
|-id=829 bgcolor=#d6d6d6
| 173829 ||  || — || October 14, 2001 || Socorro || LINEAR || — || align=right | 5.4 km || 
|-id=830 bgcolor=#d6d6d6
| 173830 ||  || — || October 13, 2001 || Socorro || LINEAR || THB || align=right | 4.8 km || 
|-id=831 bgcolor=#d6d6d6
| 173831 ||  || — || October 13, 2001 || Socorro || LINEAR || — || align=right | 3.7 km || 
|-id=832 bgcolor=#d6d6d6
| 173832 ||  || — || October 14, 2001 || Socorro || LINEAR || — || align=right | 4.9 km || 
|-id=833 bgcolor=#d6d6d6
| 173833 ||  || — || October 14, 2001 || Socorro || LINEAR || — || align=right | 3.4 km || 
|-id=834 bgcolor=#d6d6d6
| 173834 ||  || — || October 14, 2001 || Socorro || LINEAR || — || align=right | 4.8 km || 
|-id=835 bgcolor=#d6d6d6
| 173835 ||  || — || October 14, 2001 || Socorro || LINEAR || EOS || align=right | 5.5 km || 
|-id=836 bgcolor=#E9E9E9
| 173836 ||  || — || October 14, 2001 || Socorro || LINEAR || — || align=right | 4.2 km || 
|-id=837 bgcolor=#d6d6d6
| 173837 ||  || — || October 14, 2001 || Socorro || LINEAR || HYG || align=right | 4.7 km || 
|-id=838 bgcolor=#d6d6d6
| 173838 ||  || — || October 14, 2001 || Socorro || LINEAR || 7:4 || align=right | 7.7 km || 
|-id=839 bgcolor=#d6d6d6
| 173839 ||  || — || October 14, 2001 || Socorro || LINEAR || — || align=right | 4.6 km || 
|-id=840 bgcolor=#E9E9E9
| 173840 ||  || — || October 14, 2001 || Socorro || LINEAR || NEM || align=right | 3.8 km || 
|-id=841 bgcolor=#d6d6d6
| 173841 ||  || — || October 14, 2001 || Socorro || LINEAR || — || align=right | 4.6 km || 
|-id=842 bgcolor=#d6d6d6
| 173842 ||  || — || October 15, 2001 || Socorro || LINEAR || TIR || align=right | 4.3 km || 
|-id=843 bgcolor=#d6d6d6
| 173843 ||  || — || October 15, 2001 || Socorro || LINEAR || — || align=right | 3.6 km || 
|-id=844 bgcolor=#d6d6d6
| 173844 ||  || — || October 15, 2001 || Socorro || LINEAR || URS || align=right | 5.6 km || 
|-id=845 bgcolor=#d6d6d6
| 173845 ||  || — || October 12, 2001 || Haleakala || NEAT || — || align=right | 5.5 km || 
|-id=846 bgcolor=#d6d6d6
| 173846 ||  || — || October 12, 2001 || Haleakala || NEAT || 615 || align=right | 2.9 km || 
|-id=847 bgcolor=#d6d6d6
| 173847 ||  || — || October 12, 2001 || Haleakala || NEAT || — || align=right | 6.3 km || 
|-id=848 bgcolor=#d6d6d6
| 173848 ||  || — || October 12, 2001 || Haleakala || NEAT || — || align=right | 5.0 km || 
|-id=849 bgcolor=#d6d6d6
| 173849 ||  || — || October 10, 2001 || Palomar || NEAT || TRE || align=right | 4.7 km || 
|-id=850 bgcolor=#E9E9E9
| 173850 ||  || — || October 10, 2001 || Palomar || NEAT || — || align=right | 4.8 km || 
|-id=851 bgcolor=#d6d6d6
| 173851 ||  || — || October 10, 2001 || Palomar || NEAT || — || align=right | 4.7 km || 
|-id=852 bgcolor=#d6d6d6
| 173852 ||  || — || October 10, 2001 || Palomar || NEAT || EOS || align=right | 2.6 km || 
|-id=853 bgcolor=#d6d6d6
| 173853 ||  || — || October 15, 2001 || Palomar || NEAT || — || align=right | 5.2 km || 
|-id=854 bgcolor=#d6d6d6
| 173854 ||  || — || October 14, 2001 || Kitt Peak || Spacewatch || KOR || align=right | 1.8 km || 
|-id=855 bgcolor=#d6d6d6
| 173855 ||  || — || October 15, 2001 || Socorro || LINEAR || EOS || align=right | 2.9 km || 
|-id=856 bgcolor=#d6d6d6
| 173856 ||  || — || October 15, 2001 || Haleakala || NEAT || — || align=right | 3.9 km || 
|-id=857 bgcolor=#d6d6d6
| 173857 ||  || — || October 13, 2001 || Socorro || LINEAR || — || align=right | 3.1 km || 
|-id=858 bgcolor=#E9E9E9
| 173858 ||  || — || October 15, 2001 || Socorro || LINEAR || — || align=right | 3.3 km || 
|-id=859 bgcolor=#d6d6d6
| 173859 ||  || — || October 14, 2001 || Socorro || LINEAR || — || align=right | 4.6 km || 
|-id=860 bgcolor=#d6d6d6
| 173860 ||  || — || October 14, 2001 || Socorro || LINEAR || — || align=right | 4.5 km || 
|-id=861 bgcolor=#d6d6d6
| 173861 ||  || — || October 15, 2001 || Socorro || LINEAR || VER || align=right | 6.3 km || 
|-id=862 bgcolor=#d6d6d6
| 173862 ||  || — || October 12, 2001 || Haleakala || NEAT || — || align=right | 4.9 km || 
|-id=863 bgcolor=#d6d6d6
| 173863 ||  || — || October 11, 2001 || Socorro || LINEAR || — || align=right | 3.7 km || 
|-id=864 bgcolor=#d6d6d6
| 173864 ||  || — || October 11, 2001 || Socorro || LINEAR || — || align=right | 6.6 km || 
|-id=865 bgcolor=#d6d6d6
| 173865 ||  || — || October 11, 2001 || Socorro || LINEAR || — || align=right | 5.1 km || 
|-id=866 bgcolor=#d6d6d6
| 173866 ||  || — || October 11, 2001 || Socorro || LINEAR || CRO || align=right | 5.1 km || 
|-id=867 bgcolor=#d6d6d6
| 173867 ||  || — || October 13, 2001 || Palomar || NEAT || — || align=right | 4.6 km || 
|-id=868 bgcolor=#d6d6d6
| 173868 ||  || — || October 13, 2001 || Anderson Mesa || LONEOS || — || align=right | 4.2 km || 
|-id=869 bgcolor=#d6d6d6
| 173869 ||  || — || October 13, 2001 || Palomar || NEAT || EOS || align=right | 3.1 km || 
|-id=870 bgcolor=#E9E9E9
| 173870 ||  || — || October 14, 2001 || Socorro || LINEAR || — || align=right | 4.6 km || 
|-id=871 bgcolor=#d6d6d6
| 173871 ||  || — || October 15, 2001 || Palomar || NEAT || EOS || align=right | 3.4 km || 
|-id=872 bgcolor=#d6d6d6
| 173872 Andrewwest ||  ||  || October 14, 2001 || Apache Point || SDSS || — || align=right | 3.6 km || 
|-id=873 bgcolor=#E9E9E9
| 173873 ||  || — || October 10, 2001 || Palomar || NEAT || — || align=right | 2.7 km || 
|-id=874 bgcolor=#d6d6d6
| 173874 ||  || — || October 21, 2001 || Desert Eagle || W. K. Y. Yeung || ALA || align=right | 5.7 km || 
|-id=875 bgcolor=#d6d6d6
| 173875 ||  || — || October 24, 2001 || Emerald Lane || L. Ball || — || align=right | 3.5 km || 
|-id=876 bgcolor=#d6d6d6
| 173876 ||  || — || October 24, 2001 || Desert Eagle || W. K. Y. Yeung || — || align=right | 3.9 km || 
|-id=877 bgcolor=#d6d6d6
| 173877 ||  || — || October 18, 2001 || Socorro || LINEAR || EUP || align=right | 6.3 km || 
|-id=878 bgcolor=#d6d6d6
| 173878 ||  || — || October 17, 2001 || Socorro || LINEAR || — || align=right | 2.9 km || 
|-id=879 bgcolor=#d6d6d6
| 173879 ||  || — || October 17, 2001 || Socorro || LINEAR || TIR || align=right | 4.1 km || 
|-id=880 bgcolor=#d6d6d6
| 173880 ||  || — || October 17, 2001 || Socorro || LINEAR || — || align=right | 5.0 km || 
|-id=881 bgcolor=#d6d6d6
| 173881 ||  || — || October 17, 2001 || Socorro || LINEAR || — || align=right | 4.4 km || 
|-id=882 bgcolor=#d6d6d6
| 173882 ||  || — || October 17, 2001 || Socorro || LINEAR || — || align=right | 6.0 km || 
|-id=883 bgcolor=#d6d6d6
| 173883 ||  || — || October 16, 2001 || Socorro || LINEAR || — || align=right | 4.5 km || 
|-id=884 bgcolor=#d6d6d6
| 173884 ||  || — || October 17, 2001 || Socorro || LINEAR || KOR || align=right | 2.0 km || 
|-id=885 bgcolor=#d6d6d6
| 173885 ||  || — || October 17, 2001 || Socorro || LINEAR || — || align=right | 3.7 km || 
|-id=886 bgcolor=#d6d6d6
| 173886 ||  || — || October 18, 2001 || Socorro || LINEAR || — || align=right | 6.6 km || 
|-id=887 bgcolor=#d6d6d6
| 173887 ||  || — || October 16, 2001 || Socorro || LINEAR || MEL || align=right | 6.0 km || 
|-id=888 bgcolor=#d6d6d6
| 173888 ||  || — || October 20, 2001 || Socorro || LINEAR || — || align=right | 3.4 km || 
|-id=889 bgcolor=#d6d6d6
| 173889 ||  || — || October 20, 2001 || Socorro || LINEAR || KOR || align=right | 2.6 km || 
|-id=890 bgcolor=#d6d6d6
| 173890 ||  || — || October 21, 2001 || Kitt Peak || Spacewatch || KOR || align=right | 1.7 km || 
|-id=891 bgcolor=#d6d6d6
| 173891 ||  || — || October 18, 2001 || Palomar || NEAT || — || align=right | 5.1 km || 
|-id=892 bgcolor=#d6d6d6
| 173892 ||  || — || October 17, 2001 || Socorro || LINEAR || EOS || align=right | 4.4 km || 
|-id=893 bgcolor=#d6d6d6
| 173893 ||  || — || October 20, 2001 || Socorro || LINEAR || — || align=right | 4.3 km || 
|-id=894 bgcolor=#d6d6d6
| 173894 ||  || — || October 20, 2001 || Socorro || LINEAR || KOR || align=right | 2.4 km || 
|-id=895 bgcolor=#d6d6d6
| 173895 ||  || — || October 22, 2001 || Socorro || LINEAR || — || align=right | 4.1 km || 
|-id=896 bgcolor=#d6d6d6
| 173896 ||  || — || October 22, 2001 || Socorro || LINEAR || — || align=right | 3.4 km || 
|-id=897 bgcolor=#d6d6d6
| 173897 ||  || — || October 22, 2001 || Socorro || LINEAR || — || align=right | 4.8 km || 
|-id=898 bgcolor=#d6d6d6
| 173898 ||  || — || October 23, 2001 || Socorro || LINEAR || — || align=right | 3.9 km || 
|-id=899 bgcolor=#d6d6d6
| 173899 ||  || — || October 23, 2001 || Socorro || LINEAR || — || align=right | 3.5 km || 
|-id=900 bgcolor=#d6d6d6
| 173900 ||  || — || October 23, 2001 || Socorro || LINEAR || THM || align=right | 3.9 km || 
|}

173901–174000 

|-bgcolor=#d6d6d6
| 173901 ||  || — || October 23, 2001 || Socorro || LINEAR || TIR || align=right | 4.5 km || 
|-id=902 bgcolor=#d6d6d6
| 173902 ||  || — || October 23, 2001 || Socorro || LINEAR || — || align=right | 4.8 km || 
|-id=903 bgcolor=#d6d6d6
| 173903 ||  || — || October 26, 2001 || Palomar || NEAT || — || align=right | 5.1 km || 
|-id=904 bgcolor=#d6d6d6
| 173904 ||  || — || October 16, 2001 || Socorro || LINEAR || — || align=right | 4.5 km || 
|-id=905 bgcolor=#d6d6d6
| 173905 ||  || — || October 19, 2001 || Palomar || NEAT || EOS || align=right | 4.8 km || 
|-id=906 bgcolor=#d6d6d6
| 173906 ||  || — || October 25, 2001 || Socorro || LINEAR || THB || align=right | 4.7 km || 
|-id=907 bgcolor=#d6d6d6
| 173907 ||  || — || November 10, 2001 || Badlands || R. Dyvig || — || align=right | 5.8 km || 
|-id=908 bgcolor=#d6d6d6
| 173908 ||  || — || November 10, 2001 || Socorro || LINEAR || — || align=right | 4.4 km || 
|-id=909 bgcolor=#d6d6d6
| 173909 ||  || — || November 10, 2001 || Ondřejov || P. Kušnirák, P. Pravec || — || align=right | 6.1 km || 
|-id=910 bgcolor=#d6d6d6
| 173910 ||  || — || November 9, 2001 || Socorro || LINEAR || — || align=right | 5.5 km || 
|-id=911 bgcolor=#d6d6d6
| 173911 ||  || — || November 9, 2001 || Socorro || LINEAR || TIR || align=right | 4.5 km || 
|-id=912 bgcolor=#d6d6d6
| 173912 ||  || — || November 9, 2001 || Socorro || LINEAR || THM || align=right | 3.3 km || 
|-id=913 bgcolor=#d6d6d6
| 173913 ||  || — || November 9, 2001 || Socorro || LINEAR || VER || align=right | 4.4 km || 
|-id=914 bgcolor=#d6d6d6
| 173914 ||  || — || November 9, 2001 || Socorro || LINEAR || — || align=right | 5.6 km || 
|-id=915 bgcolor=#d6d6d6
| 173915 ||  || — || November 10, 2001 || Socorro || LINEAR || EOS || align=right | 3.8 km || 
|-id=916 bgcolor=#d6d6d6
| 173916 ||  || — || November 10, 2001 || Socorro || LINEAR || — || align=right | 4.3 km || 
|-id=917 bgcolor=#d6d6d6
| 173917 ||  || — || November 10, 2001 || Socorro || LINEAR || THB || align=right | 3.7 km || 
|-id=918 bgcolor=#d6d6d6
| 173918 ||  || — || November 10, 2001 || Socorro || LINEAR || — || align=right | 3.7 km || 
|-id=919 bgcolor=#d6d6d6
| 173919 ||  || — || November 10, 2001 || Socorro || LINEAR || — || align=right | 5.1 km || 
|-id=920 bgcolor=#d6d6d6
| 173920 ||  || — || November 10, 2001 || Socorro || LINEAR || — || align=right | 3.9 km || 
|-id=921 bgcolor=#d6d6d6
| 173921 ||  || — || November 10, 2001 || Socorro || LINEAR || — || align=right | 5.4 km || 
|-id=922 bgcolor=#d6d6d6
| 173922 ||  || — || November 10, 2001 || Socorro || LINEAR || HYG || align=right | 4.1 km || 
|-id=923 bgcolor=#d6d6d6
| 173923 ||  || — || November 11, 2001 || Socorro || LINEAR || — || align=right | 5.1 km || 
|-id=924 bgcolor=#d6d6d6
| 173924 ||  || — || November 11, 2001 || Socorro || LINEAR || THM || align=right | 3.4 km || 
|-id=925 bgcolor=#d6d6d6
| 173925 ||  || — || November 12, 2001 || Socorro || LINEAR || EOS || align=right | 3.6 km || 
|-id=926 bgcolor=#d6d6d6
| 173926 ||  || — || November 12, 2001 || Socorro || LINEAR || — || align=right | 5.6 km || 
|-id=927 bgcolor=#d6d6d6
| 173927 ||  || — || November 15, 2001 || Socorro || LINEAR || EOS || align=right | 3.4 km || 
|-id=928 bgcolor=#d6d6d6
| 173928 ||  || — || November 15, 2001 || Socorro || LINEAR || — || align=right | 4.5 km || 
|-id=929 bgcolor=#d6d6d6
| 173929 ||  || — || November 15, 2001 || Socorro || LINEAR || — || align=right | 4.8 km || 
|-id=930 bgcolor=#d6d6d6
| 173930 ||  || — || November 15, 2001 || Socorro || LINEAR || Tj (2.99) || align=right | 6.2 km || 
|-id=931 bgcolor=#d6d6d6
| 173931 ||  || — || November 12, 2001 || Socorro || LINEAR || — || align=right | 5.5 km || 
|-id=932 bgcolor=#d6d6d6
| 173932 ||  || — || November 12, 2001 || Socorro || LINEAR || HYG || align=right | 4.4 km || 
|-id=933 bgcolor=#d6d6d6
| 173933 ||  || — || November 12, 2001 || Socorro || LINEAR || — || align=right | 5.7 km || 
|-id=934 bgcolor=#d6d6d6
| 173934 ||  || — || November 12, 2001 || Socorro || LINEAR || — || align=right | 5.9 km || 
|-id=935 bgcolor=#d6d6d6
| 173935 ||  || — || November 11, 2001 || Socorro || LINEAR || — || align=right | 6.1 km || 
|-id=936 bgcolor=#d6d6d6
| 173936 Yuribo ||  ||  || November 17, 2001 || Kuma Kogen || A. Nakamura || — || align=right | 5.8 km || 
|-id=937 bgcolor=#d6d6d6
| 173937 ||  || — || November 17, 2001 || Socorro || LINEAR || — || align=right | 4.3 km || 
|-id=938 bgcolor=#d6d6d6
| 173938 ||  || — || November 17, 2001 || Socorro || LINEAR || EOS || align=right | 3.3 km || 
|-id=939 bgcolor=#d6d6d6
| 173939 ||  || — || November 17, 2001 || Socorro || LINEAR || EOS || align=right | 3.1 km || 
|-id=940 bgcolor=#d6d6d6
| 173940 ||  || — || November 17, 2001 || Socorro || LINEAR || — || align=right | 5.6 km || 
|-id=941 bgcolor=#d6d6d6
| 173941 ||  || — || November 19, 2001 || Socorro || LINEAR || — || align=right | 4.2 km || 
|-id=942 bgcolor=#d6d6d6
| 173942 ||  || — || November 19, 2001 || Socorro || LINEAR || — || align=right | 3.3 km || 
|-id=943 bgcolor=#d6d6d6
| 173943 ||  || — || November 19, 2001 || Socorro || LINEAR || — || align=right | 5.2 km || 
|-id=944 bgcolor=#d6d6d6
| 173944 ||  || — || November 19, 2001 || Socorro || LINEAR || THM || align=right | 2.9 km || 
|-id=945 bgcolor=#d6d6d6
| 173945 ||  || — || November 20, 2001 || Socorro || LINEAR || — || align=right | 4.8 km || 
|-id=946 bgcolor=#d6d6d6
| 173946 ||  || — || November 20, 2001 || Socorro || LINEAR || — || align=right | 4.3 km || 
|-id=947 bgcolor=#d6d6d6
| 173947 ||  || — || November 20, 2001 || Socorro || LINEAR || — || align=right | 4.0 km || 
|-id=948 bgcolor=#d6d6d6
| 173948 ||  || — || November 20, 2001 || Socorro || LINEAR || — || align=right | 3.2 km || 
|-id=949 bgcolor=#d6d6d6
| 173949 ||  || — || November 20, 2001 || Anderson Mesa || LONEOS || EOS || align=right | 3.6 km || 
|-id=950 bgcolor=#d6d6d6
| 173950 ||  || — || November 20, 2001 || Haleakala || NEAT || — || align=right | 3.8 km || 
|-id=951 bgcolor=#d6d6d6
| 173951 ||  || — || November 17, 2001 || Kitt Peak || Spacewatch || THM || align=right | 3.2 km || 
|-id=952 bgcolor=#d6d6d6
| 173952 ||  || — || December 7, 2001 || Socorro || LINEAR || EOS || align=right | 3.4 km || 
|-id=953 bgcolor=#d6d6d6
| 173953 ||  || — || December 9, 2001 || Socorro || LINEAR || — || align=right | 5.1 km || 
|-id=954 bgcolor=#d6d6d6
| 173954 ||  || — || December 9, 2001 || Socorro || LINEAR || — || align=right | 5.5 km || 
|-id=955 bgcolor=#d6d6d6
| 173955 ||  || — || December 9, 2001 || Socorro || LINEAR || TIR || align=right | 4.4 km || 
|-id=956 bgcolor=#d6d6d6
| 173956 ||  || — || December 9, 2001 || Socorro || LINEAR || — || align=right | 5.3 km || 
|-id=957 bgcolor=#d6d6d6
| 173957 ||  || — || December 9, 2001 || Socorro || LINEAR || — || align=right | 5.1 km || 
|-id=958 bgcolor=#d6d6d6
| 173958 ||  || — || December 9, 2001 || Socorro || LINEAR || — || align=right | 6.9 km || 
|-id=959 bgcolor=#d6d6d6
| 173959 ||  || — || December 9, 2001 || Socorro || LINEAR || HYG || align=right | 4.8 km || 
|-id=960 bgcolor=#d6d6d6
| 173960 ||  || — || December 7, 2001 || Kitt Peak || Spacewatch || THM || align=right | 2.6 km || 
|-id=961 bgcolor=#d6d6d6
| 173961 ||  || — || December 9, 2001 || Socorro || LINEAR || — || align=right | 5.9 km || 
|-id=962 bgcolor=#d6d6d6
| 173962 ||  || — || December 9, 2001 || Socorro || LINEAR || — || align=right | 6.1 km || 
|-id=963 bgcolor=#d6d6d6
| 173963 ||  || — || December 10, 2001 || Socorro || LINEAR || — || align=right | 4.3 km || 
|-id=964 bgcolor=#d6d6d6
| 173964 ||  || — || December 11, 2001 || Socorro || LINEAR || — || align=right | 4.8 km || 
|-id=965 bgcolor=#d6d6d6
| 173965 ||  || — || December 11, 2001 || Socorro || LINEAR || — || align=right | 4.7 km || 
|-id=966 bgcolor=#d6d6d6
| 173966 ||  || — || December 11, 2001 || Socorro || LINEAR || — || align=right | 4.3 km || 
|-id=967 bgcolor=#d6d6d6
| 173967 ||  || — || December 11, 2001 || Socorro || LINEAR || THM || align=right | 3.5 km || 
|-id=968 bgcolor=#d6d6d6
| 173968 ||  || — || December 11, 2001 || Socorro || LINEAR || — || align=right | 5.4 km || 
|-id=969 bgcolor=#d6d6d6
| 173969 ||  || — || December 11, 2001 || Socorro || LINEAR || URS || align=right | 6.9 km || 
|-id=970 bgcolor=#d6d6d6
| 173970 ||  || — || December 11, 2001 || Socorro || LINEAR || — || align=right | 5.9 km || 
|-id=971 bgcolor=#d6d6d6
| 173971 ||  || — || December 10, 2001 || Socorro || LINEAR || — || align=right | 4.5 km || 
|-id=972 bgcolor=#d6d6d6
| 173972 ||  || — || December 11, 2001 || Socorro || LINEAR || — || align=right | 4.6 km || 
|-id=973 bgcolor=#d6d6d6
| 173973 ||  || — || December 14, 2001 || Socorro || LINEAR || EOS || align=right | 2.7 km || 
|-id=974 bgcolor=#d6d6d6
| 173974 ||  || — || December 14, 2001 || Socorro || LINEAR || — || align=right | 5.9 km || 
|-id=975 bgcolor=#d6d6d6
| 173975 ||  || — || December 14, 2001 || Socorro || LINEAR || — || align=right | 4.0 km || 
|-id=976 bgcolor=#d6d6d6
| 173976 ||  || — || December 14, 2001 || Socorro || LINEAR || THM || align=right | 5.0 km || 
|-id=977 bgcolor=#E9E9E9
| 173977 ||  || — || December 14, 2001 || Socorro || LINEAR || MIT || align=right | 4.8 km || 
|-id=978 bgcolor=#d6d6d6
| 173978 ||  || — || December 14, 2001 || Socorro || LINEAR || URS || align=right | 5.7 km || 
|-id=979 bgcolor=#d6d6d6
| 173979 ||  || — || December 14, 2001 || Socorro || LINEAR || — || align=right | 4.9 km || 
|-id=980 bgcolor=#d6d6d6
| 173980 ||  || — || December 14, 2001 || Socorro || LINEAR || — || align=right | 3.9 km || 
|-id=981 bgcolor=#d6d6d6
| 173981 ||  || — || December 14, 2001 || Socorro || LINEAR || EOS || align=right | 3.3 km || 
|-id=982 bgcolor=#d6d6d6
| 173982 ||  || — || December 14, 2001 || Socorro || LINEAR || THM || align=right | 3.2 km || 
|-id=983 bgcolor=#d6d6d6
| 173983 ||  || — || December 14, 2001 || Socorro || LINEAR || THM || align=right | 2.8 km || 
|-id=984 bgcolor=#d6d6d6
| 173984 ||  || — || December 14, 2001 || Socorro || LINEAR || — || align=right | 3.9 km || 
|-id=985 bgcolor=#d6d6d6
| 173985 ||  || — || December 14, 2001 || Socorro || LINEAR || — || align=right | 6.2 km || 
|-id=986 bgcolor=#d6d6d6
| 173986 ||  || — || December 14, 2001 || Socorro || LINEAR || THM || align=right | 3.5 km || 
|-id=987 bgcolor=#d6d6d6
| 173987 ||  || — || December 14, 2001 || Socorro || LINEAR || THM || align=right | 3.1 km || 
|-id=988 bgcolor=#d6d6d6
| 173988 ||  || — || December 14, 2001 || Socorro || LINEAR || — || align=right | 4.3 km || 
|-id=989 bgcolor=#d6d6d6
| 173989 ||  || — || December 14, 2001 || Socorro || LINEAR || — || align=right | 7.1 km || 
|-id=990 bgcolor=#d6d6d6
| 173990 ||  || — || December 14, 2001 || Socorro || LINEAR || — || align=right | 4.4 km || 
|-id=991 bgcolor=#d6d6d6
| 173991 ||  || — || December 14, 2001 || Socorro || LINEAR || THM || align=right | 3.6 km || 
|-id=992 bgcolor=#d6d6d6
| 173992 ||  || — || December 14, 2001 || Socorro || LINEAR || — || align=right | 5.8 km || 
|-id=993 bgcolor=#d6d6d6
| 173993 ||  || — || December 14, 2001 || Socorro || LINEAR || — || align=right | 7.7 km || 
|-id=994 bgcolor=#d6d6d6
| 173994 ||  || — || December 15, 2001 || Socorro || LINEAR || — || align=right | 6.2 km || 
|-id=995 bgcolor=#d6d6d6
| 173995 ||  || — || December 11, 2001 || Socorro || LINEAR || EOS || align=right | 2.8 km || 
|-id=996 bgcolor=#d6d6d6
| 173996 ||  || — || December 11, 2001 || Socorro || LINEAR || HYG || align=right | 4.9 km || 
|-id=997 bgcolor=#d6d6d6
| 173997 ||  || — || December 11, 2001 || Socorro || LINEAR || HYG || align=right | 4.9 km || 
|-id=998 bgcolor=#d6d6d6
| 173998 ||  || — || December 11, 2001 || Socorro || LINEAR || — || align=right | 4.1 km || 
|-id=999 bgcolor=#d6d6d6
| 173999 ||  || — || December 15, 2001 || Socorro || LINEAR || — || align=right | 4.0 km || 
|-id=000 bgcolor=#d6d6d6
| 174000 ||  || — || December 15, 2001 || Socorro || LINEAR || — || align=right | 4.4 km || 
|}

References

External links 
 Discovery Circumstances: Numbered Minor Planets (170001)–(175000) (IAU Minor Planet Center)

0173